The royal descendants of John William Friso, Prince of Orange currently occupy all the hereditary European royal thrones. Friso and his wife, Landgravine Marie Louise of Hesse-Kassel, are the most recent common ancestors of all European monarchs, current and former, that have reigned since World War II. Louis IX, Landgrave of Hesse-Darmstadt and his wife, Countess Palatine Caroline of Zweibrücken, are the most recent common ancestors of all current European monarchs, but not all of the living and deceased monarchs since World War II.

Chart
Currently reigning Monarchs in bold.

Albania

Wilhelm, Prince of Albania, the only ruler of the Principality of Albania, was descended from Friso through his son in two ways.

Through his son's son, William V, Prince of Orange:
 John William Friso, Prince of Orange (1687–1711) m. Landgravine Marie Louise of Hesse-Kassel
 William IV, Prince of Orange (1711–1751) m. Anne, Princess Royal
 William V, Prince of Orange (1748–1806) m. Princess Wilhelmina of Prussia
 William I of the Netherlands (1772–1843) m. Princess Wilhelmina of Prussia
 Prince Frederick of the Netherlands (1797–1881) m. Princess Louise of Prussia
 Princess Marie of the Netherlands (1841–1910) m. William, Prince of Wied
 Wilhelm, Prince of Albania (1876–1945) m. Princess Sophie of Schönburg-Waldenburg
 Carol Victor, Hereditary Prince of Albania (1913–1973) m. Eileen Johnston – pretender
Through his son's daughter, Princess Carolina of Orange-Nassau:
 Same as #1 above
 Same as #2 above
 Princess Carolina of Orange-Nassau (1743–1787) m. Charles Christian, Prince of Nassau-Weilburg
 Frederick William, Prince of Nassau-Weilburg (1768–1816) m. Burgravine Louise Isabelle of Kirchberg
 William, Duke of Nassau (1792–1839) m. Princess Louise of Saxe-Hildburghausen
 Princess Marie of Nassau (1825–1902) m. Hermann, Prince of Wied
 William, Prince of Wied (1845–1907) m. Princess Marie of the Netherlands
 Same as #7 above
 Same as #8 above

Austria-Hungary

Charles I of Austria, the last reigning Emperor of Austria and King of Hungary, was descended from Friso twice through his daughter's son and once through his son:
 John William Friso, Prince of Orange (1687–1711) m. Landgravine Marie Louise of Hesse-Kassel
 Princess Amalia of Nassau-Dietz (1710–1777) m. Frederick, Hereditary Prince of Baden-Durlach
 Charles Frederick, Grand Duke of Baden (1728–1811) m. Landgravine Caroline Louise of Hesse-Darmstadt
 Charles Louis, Hereditary Prince of Baden (1755–1801) m. Princess Amalie of Hesse-Darmstadt
 Princess Caroline of Baden (1776–1841) m. Maximilian I Joseph of Bavaria
 Princess Sophie of Bavaria (1805–1872) m. Archduke Franz Karl of Austria
 Archduke Karl Ludwig of Austria (1833–1896) m. Princess Maria Annunciata of Bourbon-Two Sicilies
 Archduke Otto of Austria (1865–1906) m. Princess Maria Josepha of Saxony
 Charles I of Austria (1887–1922) m. Princess Zita of Bourbon-Parma
 Otto von Habsburg (1912–2011) m. Princess Regina of Saxe-Meiningen – pretender
 Karl von Habsburg (1961–) m. Francesca Thyssen-Bornemisza – pretender

 Same as #1 above
 Same as #2 above
 Same as #3 above
 Same as #4 above
 Same as #5 above
 Amalie Auguste of Bavaria (1801–1877) m. John of Saxony
 George, King of Saxony (1832–1904) m. Infanta Maria Ana of Portugal
 Princess Maria Josepha of Saxony (1867–1944) m. Archduke Otto of Austria
 Same as #9 above
 Same as #10 above
 Same as #11 above

 Same as #1 above
 William IV, Prince of Orange (1711–1751) m. Anne, Princess Royal
 Princess Carolina of Orange-Nassau (1743–1787) m. Charles Christian, Prince of Nassau-Weilburg
 Frederick William, Prince of Nassau-Weilburg (1768–1816) m. Burgravine Louise Isabelle of Kirchberg
 Princess Henrietta of Nassau-Weilburg (1797–1829) m. Archduke Charles, Duke of Teschen
 Archduchess Maria Theresa of Austria (1816–1867) m. Ferdinand II of the Two Sicilies
 Princess Maria Annunciata of Bourbon-Two Sicilies (1843–1871) m. Archduke Karl Ludwig of Austria
 Same as #8 in the first list
 Same as #9 above
 Same as #10 above
 Same as #11 above

Belgium

King Philippe of Belgium is descended from Friso through both his son and his daughter's son.

Through his son's son, William V, Prince of Orange:
 John William Friso, Prince of Orange (1687–1711) m. Landgravine Marie Louise of Hesse-Kassel
 William IV, Prince of Orange (1711–1751) m. Anne, Princess Royal
 William V, Prince of Orange (1748–1806) m. Princess Wilhelmina of Prussia
 William I of the Netherlands (1772–1843) m. Princess Wilhelmina of Prussia
 Prince Frederick of the Netherlands (1797–1881) m. Princess Louise of Prussia
 Princess Louise of the Netherlands (1828–1871) m. Charles XV of Sweden
 Princess Louise of Sweden (1851–1926) m. Frederick VIII of Denmark
 Princess Ingeborg of Denmark (1878–1958) m. Prince Carl, Duke of Västergötland
 Princess Astrid of Sweden (1905–1935) m. Leopold III of Belgium
 Albert II of Belgium (1934–) m. Paola Ruffo di Calabria
 Philippe of Belgium (1960–) m. Mathilde d'Udekem d'Acoz

Through his son's daughter, Princess Carolina of Orange-Nassau:
 Same as #1 above
 Same as #2 above
 Princess Carolina of Orange-Nassau (1743–1787) m. Charles Christian, Prince of Nassau-Weilburg
 Frederick William, Prince of Nassau-Weilburg (1768–1816) m. Burgravine Louise Isabelle of Kirchberg
 William, Duke of Nassau (1792–1839) m. Princess Pauline of Württemberg
 Princess Sophia of Nassau (1836–1913) m. Oscar II of Sweden
 Prince Carl, Duke of Västergötland (1861–1951) m. Princess Ingeborg of Denmark
 Same as #9 above
 Same as #10 above
 Same as #11 above

Through his daughter, Princess Amalia of Nassau-Dietz in two ways: 
 Same as #1 above
 Princess Amalia of Nassau-Dietz (1710–1777) m. Frederick, Hereditary Prince of Baden-Durlach
 Charles Frederick, Grand Duke of Baden (1728–1811) m. Landgravine Caroline Louise of Hesse-Darmstadt
 Charles Louis, Hereditary Prince of Baden (1755–1801) m. Princess Amalie of Hesse-Darmstadt
 Charles, Grand Duke of Baden (1786–1818) m. Stéphanie de Beauharnais
 Princess Josephine of Baden (1813–1900) m. Karl Anton, Prince of Hohenzollern
 Princess Marie of Hohenzollern-Sigmaringen (1845–1912) m. Prince Philippe, Count of Flanders
 Albert I of Belgium (1875–1934) m. Duchess Elisabeth in Bavaria
 Leopold III of Belgium (1901–1983) m. Princess Astrid of Sweden
 Same as #9 above
 Same as #10 above

 Same as #1 above
 Same as #2 above
 Same as #3 above
 Same as #4 above
 Caroline of Baden (1776–1841) m. Maximilian I Joseph of Bavaria
 Princess Ludovika of Bavaria (1808–1892) m. Duke Maximilian Joseph in Bavaria
 Karl Theodor, Duke in Bavaria (1839–1909) m. Infanta Maria Josepha of Portugal
 Duchess Elisabeth in Bavaria (1876–1965) m. Albert I of Belgium
 Same as #9 above
 Same as #10 above
 Same as #11 above

Brazil
At present, both lines that lay claim to the throne of the former Empire of Brazil, have produced claimants who are descended from Friso.

The claimant of the Vassouras branch, Prince Luiz of Orléans-Braganza, is descended from his son's daughter in two ways:
 John William Friso, Prince of Orange (1687–1711) m. Landgravine Marie Louise of Hesse-Kassel
 William IV, Prince of Orange (1711–1751) m. Anne, Princess Royal
 Princess Carolina of Orange-Nassau (1743–1787) m. Charles Christian, Prince of Nassau-Weilburg
 Frederick William, Prince of Nassau-Weilburg (1768–1816) m. Burgravine Louise Isabelle of Kirchberg
 Princess Henrietta of Nassau-Weilburg (1797–1829) m. Archduke Charles, Duke of Teschen
 Archduchess Maria Theresa of Austria (1816–1867) m. Ferdinand II of the Two Sicilies
 Prince Alfonso, Count of Caserta (1841–1934) m. Princess Maria Antonietta of Bourbon-Two Sicilies
 Princess Maria di Grazia of Bourbon-Two Sicilies (1878–1973) m. Prince Luís of Orléans-Braganza
 Prince Pedro Henrique of Orléans-Braganza (1909–1981) m. Princess Maria Elisabeth of Bavaria
 Bertrand of Orléans-Braganza (1941–) - pretender

 Same as #1 above
 Same as #2 above
 Same as #3 above
 Princess Henriette of Nassau-Weilburg (1780–1857) m. Duke Louis of Württemberg
 Duchess Maria Dorothea of Württemberg (1797–1855) m. Archduke Joseph of Austria
 Archduchess Elisabeth Franziska of Austria (1831–1903) m. Archduke Ferdinand Karl Viktor of Austria-Este
 Maria Theresa of Austria-Este (1849–1919) m. Ludwig III of Bavaria
 Prince Franz of Bavaria (1875–1957) m. Princess Isabella Antonie of Croÿ 
 Princess Maria Elisabeth of Bavaria (1914–2011) m. Pedro Henrique of Orléans-Braganza
 Same as #10 above

The claimant of the Petrópolis branch, Pedro Carlos of Orléans-Braganza, is also descended from his son's daughter:
 John William Friso, Prince of Orange (1687–1711) m. Landgravine Marie Louise of Hesse-Kassel
 William IV, Prince of Orange (1711–1751) m. Anne, Princess Royal
 Princess Carolina of Orange-Nassau (1743–1787) m. Charles Christian, Prince of Nassau-Weilburg
 Frederick William, Prince of Nassau-Weilburg (1768–1816) m. Burgravine Louise Isabelle of Kirchberg
 Princess Henrietta of Nassau-Weilburg (1797–1829) m. Archduke Charles, Duke of Teschen
 Archduchess Maria Theresa of Austria (1816–1867) m. Ferdinand II of the Two Sicilies
 Prince Alfonso, Count of Caserta (1841–1934) m. Princess Maria Antonietta of Bourbon-Two Sicilies
 Prince Carlos of Bourbon-Two Sicilies (1870–1949) m. Princess Louise of Orléans
 Princess María de la Esperanza of Bourbon-Two Sicilies (1914–2005) m. Prince Pedro Gastão of Orléans-Braganza
 Prince Pedro Carlos of Orléans-Braganza (1945–) m. Rony Kuhn de Souza - pretender

Bulgaria

Simeon II of Bulgaria, the last Bulgarian Tsar, is descended from Friso through his son's daughter and his daughter's son.

Through his son, William IV, Prince of Orange:
 John William Friso, Prince of Orange (1687–1711) m. Landgravine Marie Louise of Hesse-Kassel
 William IV, Prince of Orange (1711–1751) m. Anne, Princess Royal
 Princess Carolina of Orange-Nassau (1743–1787) m. Charles Christian, Prince of Nassau-Weilburg
 Frederick William, Prince of Nassau-Weilburg (1768–1816) m. Burgravine Louise Isabelle of Kirchberg
 Princess Henrietta of Nassau-Weilburg (1797–1829) m. Archduke Charles, Duke of Teschen
 Archduchess Maria Theresa of Austria (1816–1867) m. Ferdinand II of the Two Sicilies
 Princess Maria Pia of the Two Sicilies (1849–1882) m. Robert I, Duke of Parma
 Princess Marie Louise of Bourbon-Parma (1870–1899) m. Ferdinand I of Bulgaria
 Boris III of Bulgaria (1894–1943) m. Princess Giovanna of Italy
 Simeon II of Bulgaria (1937–) m. Margarita Gómez-Acebo y Cejuela

Through his daughter, Princess Amalia of Nassau-Dietz:
 Same as #1 above
 Princess Amalia of Nassau-Dietz (1710–1777) m. Frederick, Hereditary Prince of Baden-Durlach
 Charles Frederick, Grand Duke of Baden (1728–1811) m. Louise Caroline Geyer von Geyersberg
 Charles Louis, Hereditary Prince of Baden (1755–1801) m. Princess Amalie of Hesse-Darmstadt
 Princess Caroline of Baden (1776–1841) m. Maximilian I Joseph of Bavaria
 Princess Amalie Auguste of Bavaria (1801–1877) m. John of Saxony
 Princess Elisabeth of Saxony (1830–1912) m. Prince Ferdinand, Duke of Genoa
 Princess Margherita of Savoy (1851–1926) m. Umberto I of Italy
 Victor Emmanuel III of Italy (1869–1947) m. Princess Elena of Montenegro
 Princess Giovanna of Italy (1907–2000) m. Boris III of Bulgaria
 Same as #10 above

Denmark

Queen Margrethe II of Denmark is descended from Friso through his son in two ways and his daughter in four:
 John William Friso, Prince of Orange (1687–1711) m. Landgravine Marie Louise of Hesse-Kassel
 William IV, Prince of Orange (1711–1751) m. Anne, Princess Royal
 William V, Prince of Orange (1748–1806) m. Princess Wilhelmina of Prussia
 William I of the Netherlands (1772–1843) m. Princess Wilhelmina of Prussia
 Prince Frederick of the Netherlands (1797–1881) m. Princess Louise of Prussia
 Princess Louise of the Netherlands (1828–1871) m. Charles XV of Sweden
 Princess Louise of Sweden (1851–1926) m. Frederick VIII of Denmark
 Christian X of Denmark (1870–1947) m. Duchess Alexandrine of Mecklenburg-Schwerin
 Frederick IX of Denmark (1899–1972) m. Princess Ingrid of Sweden
 Margrethe II of Denmark (1940–) m. Henri de Laborde de Monpezat

 Same as #1 above
 Princess Amalia of Nassau-Dietz (1710–1777) m. Frederick, Hereditary Prince of Baden-Durlach
 Charles Frederick, Grand Duke of Baden (1728–1811) m. Louise Caroline Geyer von Geyersberg
 Leopold, Grand Duke of Baden (1790–1852) m. Princess Sophie of Sweden
 Princess Cecilie of Baden (1839–1891) m. Grand Duke Michael Nikolaevich of Russia
 Grand Duchess Anastasia Mikhailovna of Russia (1860–1922) m. Frederick Francis III, Grand Duke of Mecklenburg-Schwerin
 Duchess Alexandrine of Mecklenburg-Schwerin (1879–1952) m. Christian X of Denmark
 Same as #9 above
 Same as #10 above

 Same as #1 above
 Same as #2 above
 Same as #3 above, but m. Landgravine Caroline Louise of Hesse-Darmstadt
 Charles Louis, Hereditary Prince of Baden (1755–1801) m. Princess Amalie of Hesse-Darmstadt
 Princess Frederica of Baden (1781–1826) m. Gustav IV Adolf of Sweden
 Princess Sophie of Sweden (1801–1865) m. Leopold, Grand Duke of Baden
 Same as #5 above
 Same as #6 above
 Same as #7 above
 Same as #8 above
 Same as #9 above

 Same as #1 above
 Same as #2 above
 Same as #3 above in the second list
 Leopold, Grand Duke of Baden (1790–1852) m. Princess Sophie of Sweden
 Frederick I, Grand Duke of Baden (1826–1907) m. Princess Louise of Prussia
 Princess Victoria of Baden (1862–1930) m. Gustaf V of Sweden
 Gustaf VI Adolf of Sweden (1882–1973) m. Princess Margaret of Connaught 
 Princess Ingrid of Sweden (1910–2000) m. Frederick IX of Denmark
 Same as #11 above

 Same as #1 above
 Same as #2 above
 Same as #3 above in the third list
 Same as #4 above in the third list
 Same as #5 above in the third list
 Same as #6 above in the third list
 Same as #5 above
 Same as #6 above
 Same as #7 above
 Same as #8 above
 Same as #9 above

 Same as #1 above
 William IV, Prince of Orange (1711–1751) m. Anne, Princess Royal
 Princess Carolina of Orange-Nassau (1743–1787) m. Charles Christian, Prince of Nassau-Weilburg
 Frederick William, Prince of Nassau-Weilburg (1768–1816) m. Burgravine Louise Isabelle of Kirchberg
 William, Duke of Nassau (1792–1839) m. Princess Pauline of Württemberg
 Princess Sophia of Nassau (1836–1913) m. Oscar II of Sweden
 Gustaf V of Sweden (1858–1950) m. Princess Victoria of Baden
 Same as #8 above
 Same as #9 above
 Same as #10 above
 Reference:

France 

At present, of France's three monarchist movements, Orléanism, Legitimism and Bonapartism; all have produced claimants to the defunct French throne, who are descendants of Friso.

The Orléanist claimant, Jean, Count of Paris, is descended from Friso through his son's daughter in three ways and his daughter in another:
 John William Friso, Prince of Orange (1687–1711) m. Landgravine Marie Louise of Hesse-Kassel
 William IV, Prince of Orange (1711–1751) m. Anne, Princess Royal
 Princess Carolina of Orange-Nassau (1743–1787) m. Charles Christian, Prince of Nassau-Weilburg
 Frederick William, Prince of Nassau-Weilburg (1768–1816) m. Burgravine Louise Isabelle of Kirchberg
 Princess Henrietta of Nassau-Weilburg (1797–1829) m. Archduke Charles, Duke of Teschen
 Archduke Albrecht, Duke of Teschen (1817–1895) m. Princess Hildegard of Bavaria
 Archduchess Maria Theresa of Austria (1845–1927) m. Duke Philipp of Württemberg
 Albrecht, Duke of Württemberg (1865–1939) m. Archduchess Margarete Sophie of Austria
 Philipp Albrecht, Duke of Württemberg (1893–1975) m. Archduchess Rosa of Austria
 Duchess Marie-Thérèse of Württemberg (1934-) m. Henri, Count of Paris
 Jean, Count of Paris (1965-) - pretender

 Same as #1 above
 Same as #2 above
 Same as #3 above
 Same as #4 above
 Same as #5 above
 Maria Theresa of Austria (1816–1867) m. Ferdinand II of the Two Sicilies
 Princess Maria Annunciata of Bourbon-Two Sicilies (1843–1871) m. Archduke Karl Ludwig of Austria
 Archduchess Margarete Sophie of Austria (1870–1902) m. Albrecht, Duke of Württemberg
 Same as #9
 Same as #10 above
 Same as #11 above

 Same as #1 above
 Same as #2 above
 Same as #3 above
 Same as #4 above
 Same as #5 above
 Same as #6 above
 Prince Alfonso, Count of Caserta (1841–1934) m. Princess Maria Antonietta of Bourbon-Two Sicilies
 Princess Maria Cristina of Bourbon-Two Sicilies (1877–1947) m. Archduke Peter Ferdinand of Austria
 Archduchess Rosa of Austria (1906–1983) m. Philipp Albrecht, Duke of Württemberg
 Same as #10 above
 Same as #11 above

 Same as #1 above
 Princess Amalia of Nassau-Dietz (1710–1777) m. Frederick, Hereditary Prince of Baden-Durlach
 Charles Frederick, Grand Duke of Baden (1728–1811) m. Landgravine Caroline Louise of Hesse-Darmstadt
 Charles Louis, Hereditary Prince of Baden (1755–1801) m. Princess Amalie of Hesse-Darmstadt
 Princess Caroline of Baden (1776–1841) m. Maximilian I Joseph of Bavaria
 Princess Sophie of Bavaria (1805–1872) m. Archduke Franz Karl of Austria
 Archduke Karl Ludwig of Austria (1833–1896) m. Princess Maria Annunciata of Bourbon-Two Sicilies
 Same as #8 in the second list
 Same as #9 in the second list
 Same as #10 above
 Same as #11 above

The Legitimist claimant, Louis Alphonse, Duke of Anjou, is descended from Friso in three ways, twice through his son's daughter, and once through his daughter's son:

 John William Friso, Prince of Orange (1687–1711) m. Landgravine Marie Louise of Hesse-Kassel
 William IV, Prince of Orange (1711–1751) m. Anne, Princess Royal
 Princess Carolina of Orange-Nassau (1743–1787) m. Charles Christian, Prince of Nassau-Weilburg
 Princess Henriette of Nassau-Weilburg (1780–1857) m. Duke Louis of Württemberg
 Duchess Maria Dorothea of Württemberg (1797–1855) m. Archduke Joseph, Palatine of Hungary
 Archduchess Elisabeth Franziska of Austria (1831–1903) m. Archduke Karl Ferdinand of Austria
 Archduchess Maria Christina of Austria (1858–1929) m. Alfonso XII of Spain
 Alfonso XIII of Spain (1886–1941) m. Princess Victoria Eugenie of Battenberg
 Infante Jaime, Duke of Segovia (1908-1975) m. Emmanuelle de Dampierre
 Alfonso, Duke of Anjou and Cádiz (1936-1988) m. Carmen Martínez-Bordiú, 2nd Duchess of Franco
 Louis Alphonse, Duke of Anjou (1974-) - pretender

 Same as #1 above
 Same as #2 above
 Same as #3 above
 Frederick William, Prince of Nassau-Weilburg (1768–1816) m. Burgravine Louise Isabelle of Kirchberg
 Princess Henrietta of Nassau-Weilburg (1797–1829) m. Archduke Charles, Duke of Teschen
 Archduke Karl Ferdinand of Austria (1818–1874) m. Archduchess Elisabeth Franziska of Austria
 Same as #7
 Same as #8
 Same as #9
 Same as #10 above
 Same as #11 above

 Same as #1 above
 Princess Amalia of Nassau-Dietz (1710–1777) m. Frederick, Hereditary Prince of Baden-Durlach
 Charles Frederick, Grand Duke of Baden (1728–1811) m. Landgravine Caroline Louise of Hesse-Darmstadt
 Charles Louis, Hereditary Prince of Baden (1755–1801) m. Princess Amalie of Hesse-Darmstadt
 Princess Wilhelmine of Baden (1788–1836) m. Louis II, Grand Duke of Hesse
 Prince Alexander of Hesse and by Rhine (1823–1888) m. Countess Julia von Hauke
 Prince Henry of Battenberg (1858–1896) m. Princess Beatrice of the United Kingdom
 Princess Victoria Eugenie of Battenberg (1887–1969) m. Alfonso XIII of Spain
 Same as #9 above
 Same as #10 above
 Same as #11 above

The Bonapartist claimants, Charles, Prince Napoléon and his son Jean-Christophe, Prince Napoléon, are descended from Friso through his son's daughter:
 John William Friso, Prince of Orange (1687–1711) m. Landgravine Marie Louise of Hesse-Kassel
 William IV, Prince of Orange (1711–1751) m. Anne, Princess Royal
 Princess Carolina of Orange-Nassau (1743–1787) m. Charles Christian, Prince of Nassau-Weilburg
 Princess Henriette of Nassau-Weilburg (1780–1857) m. Duke Louis of Württemberg
 Duchess Maria Dorothea of Württemberg (1797–1855) m. Archduke Joseph, Palatine of Hungary
 Archduchess Marie Henriette of Austria (1836–1902) m. Leopold II of Belgium
 Princess Clémentine of Belgium (1872–1955) m. Victor, Prince Napoléon
 Louis, Prince Napoléon (1914–1997) m. Alix de Foresta
 Charles, Prince Napoléon (1950–) m. Princess Béatrice of Bourbon-Two Sicilies - co-pretender
 Jean-Christophe, Prince Napoléon (1986–) m. Countess Olympia von und zu Arco-Zinneberg - co-pretender

 Reference:

Jean-Christophe additional descends from Friso through his son's daughter in an additional way:

 Same as #1 above
 Same as #2 above
 Same as #3 above
 Frederick William, Prince of Nassau-Weilburg (1768–1816) m. Burgravine Louise Isabelle of Kirchberg
 Princess Henrietta of Nassau-Weilburg (1797–1829) m. Archduke Charles, Duke of Teschen
 Archduchess Maria Theresa of Austria (1816–1867) m. Ferdinand II of the Two Sicilies
 Prince Alfonso, Count of Caserta (1841–1934) m. Princess Maria Antonietta of Bourbon-Two Sicilies
 Prince Ranieri, Duke of Castro (1883–1973) m. Countess Maria Carolina Zamoyska
 Prince Ferdinand, Duke of Castro (1926–2008) m. Chantal de Chevron-Villette
 Princess Béatrice of Bourbon-Two Sicilies (1950–) m. Charles, Prince Napoléon
 Same as # 10

Jean-Christophe's wife Olympia von und zu Arco-Zinneberg also descends from Friso through both his son and daughter:

 Same as #1 above
 Same as #2 above
 Same as #3 above
 Same as #4 above
 Same as #5 above
 Same as #6 above
 Princess Maria Annunciata of Bourbon-Two Sicilies (1843–1871) m. Archduke Karl Ludwig of Austria
 Archduke Otto of Austria (1865–1906) m. Princess Maria Josepha of Saxony
 Charles I of Austria (1887–1922) m. Princess Zita of Bourbon-Parma
 Robert, Archduke of Austria-Este (1915–1996) m. Princess Margherita of Savoy-Aosta
 Archduchess Maria Beatrice of Austria-Este (1954–) m.  Count Riprand von und zu Arco-Zinneberg
 Olympia von und zu Arco-Zinneberg (1988–) m. Jean-Christophe, Prince Napoléon

 Same as #1 above
 Same as #2 above
 Same as #3 above
 Princess Henriette of Nassau-Weilburg (1780–1857) m. Duke Louis of Württemberg
 Duchess Maria Dorothea of Württemberg (1797–1855) m. Archduke Joseph, Palatine of Hungary
 Archduchess Elisabeth Franziska of Austria (1831–1903) m. Archduke Ferdinand Karl Viktor of Austria-Este
 Archduchess Maria Theresa of Austria-Este (1849–1919) m. Ludwig III of Bavaria
 Princess Gundelinde of Bavaria (1891–1983) m. Count Jean-Georges von Preysing-Lichtenegg-Moos
 Countess Maria Theresia von Preysing-Lichtenegg-Moos (1922–2003) m. Count Ulrich Philipp von und zu Arco-Zinneberg
 Count Riprand von und zu Arco-Zinneberg (1955–2021) m. Archduchess Maria Beatrice of Austria-Este
 Same as #12 above

 Same as #1 above
 Princess Amalia of Nassau-Dietz (1710–1777) m. Frederick, Hereditary Prince of Baden-Durlach
 Charles Frederick, Grand Duke of Baden (1728–1811) m. Landgravine Caroline Louise of Hesse-Darmstadt
 Charles Louis, Hereditary Prince of Baden (1755–1801) m. Princess Amalie of Hesse-Darmstadt
 Princess Caroline of Baden (1776–1841) m. Maximilian I Joseph of Bavaria
 Princess Sophie of Bavaria (1805–1872) m. Archduke Franz Karl of Austria
 Archduke Karl Ludwig of Austria (1833–1896) m. Princess Maria Annunciata of Bourbon-Two Sicilies
 Same as #8 in the first list
 Same as #9 in the first list
 Same as #10 in the first list
 Same as #11 in the first list
 Same as #11 above

 Same as #1 above
 Same as #2 above
 Same as #3 above
 Same as #4 above
 Same as #5 above
 Amalie Auguste of Bavaria (1801–1877) m. John of Saxony
 George, King of Saxony (1832–1904) m. Infanta Maria Ana of Portugal
 Princess Maria Josepha of Saxony (1867–1944) m. Archduke Otto of Austria
 Same as #9 above
 Same as #10 above
 Same as #11 above
 Same as #12 above

Germany

At the time of the dissolution of the German Empire in 1918, all but four Constituent States of Imperial Germany had produced reigning monarchs who were descended from Friso. The four monarchs who were not descendants of Friso were Joachim Ernst, Duke of Anhalt, the last ruler of the Duchy of Anhalt; Adolphus Frederick VI, Grand Duke of Mecklenburg-Strelitz, the last reigning Grand Duke of Mecklenburg-Strelitz; Alexander, Prince of Lippe, the sovereign of the Principality of Lippe; and Günther Victor, Prince of Schwarzburg. the last monarch of the unified principalities of Schwarzburg-Rudolstadt and Schwarzburg-Sondershausen.

Baden

Frederick II, Grand Duke of Baden, the last reigning Grand Duke of Baden, a constituent of the German Empire, was descended from Friso twice through his daughter's son:
 John William Friso, Prince of Orange (1687–1711) m. Landgravine Marie Louise of Hesse-Kassel
 Princess Amalia of Nassau-Dietz (1710–1777) m. Frederick, Hereditary Prince of Baden-Durlach
 Charles Frederick, Grand Duke of Baden (1728–1811) m. Louise Caroline Geyer von Geyersberg
 Leopold, Grand Duke of Baden (1790–1852) m. Princess Sophie of Sweden
 Frederick I, Grand Duke of Baden (1826–1907) m. Princess Louise of Prussia
 Frederick II, Grand Duke of Baden (1857–1928) m. Princess Hilda of Nassau

 Same as #1 above
 Same as #2 above
 Same as #3 above, but m. Landgravine Caroline Louise of Hesse-Darmstadt
 Charles Louis, Hereditary Prince of Baden (1755–1801) m. Princess Amalie of Hesse-Darmstadt
 Frederica of Baden (1781–1826) m. Gustav IV Adolf of Sweden
 Princess Sophie of Sweden (1801–1865) m. Leopold, Grand Duke of Baden
 Same as #5 above
 Same as #6 above

Frederick II had no children, so upon his death his first cousin Prince Maximilian of Baden became the pretender. Here is his lineage:
 Same as #1 above
 Same as #2 above
 Same as #3 in the first list
 Same as #4 in the first list
 Prince Wilhelm of Baden (1829–1897) m. Princess Maria Maximilianovna of Leuchtenberg
 Prince Maximilian of Baden (1867–1929) m. Princess Marie Louise of Hanover – pretender
 Berthold, Margrave of Baden (1906–1963) m. Princess Theodora of Greece and Denmark – pretender
 Maximilian, Margrave of Baden (1933–2022) m. Archduchess Valerie of Austria – pretender
 Bernhard, Margrave of Baden (1970–) m. Stephanie Anne Kaul – pretender

 Same as #1 above
 Same as #2 above
 Same as #3 in the second list
 Same as #4 in the second list
 Same as #5 in the second list
 Same as #6 in the second list
 Same as #5 above
 Same as #6 above
 Same as #7 above
 Same as #8 above
 Same as #9 above

Maximilian's great-grandson and the current pretender, is additionally descended from Friso through his mother, paternal grandmother, and paternal great-grandmother's lineage:

 Same as #1 above
 William IV, Prince of Orange (1711–1751) m. Anne, Princess Royal
 Princess Carolina of Orange-Nassau (1743–1787) m. Charles Christian, Prince of Nassau-Weilburg
 Princess Henriette of Nassau-Weilburg (1780–1857) m. Duke Louis of Württemberg
 Duchess Amelia of Württemberg (1799–1848) m. Joseph, Duke of Saxe-Altenburg
 Marie of Saxe-Altenburg (1818–1907) m. George V of Hanover
 Ernest Augustus, Crown Prince of Hanover (1845–1923) m. Princess Thyra of Denmark
 Princess Marie Louise of Hanover (1879–1948) m. Prince Maximilian of Baden
 Same as #9 above
 Same as #10 above
 Same as #11 above

 Same as #1 above
 Same as #2 above
 Same as #3 above
 Same as #4 above
 Same as #5 above
 Princess Alexandra of Saxe-Altenburg (1830–1911) m. Grand Duke Konstantin Nikolayevich of Russia
 Grand Duchess Olga Constantinovna of Russia (1851–1926) m. George I of Greece
 Prince Andrew of Greece and Denmark (1882–1944) m. Princess Alice of Battenberg
 Princess Theodora of Greece and Denmark (1906–1969) m. Berthold, Margrave of Baden
 Same as #10 above
 Same as #11 above

 Same as #1 above
 Same as #2 in the first list
 Same as #3 in the second list
 Same as #4 in the second list
 Princess Wilhelmine of Baden (1788–1836) m. Louis II, Grand Duke of Hesse
 Prince Alexander of Hesse and by Rhine (1823–1888) m. Countess Julia von Hauke
 Prince Louis of Battenberg (1854–1921) m. Princess Victoria of Hesse and by Rhine
 Princess Alice of Battenberg (1885–1969) m. Prince Andrew of Greece and Denmark
 Same as #9 above
 Same as #10 above
 Same as #11 above

 Same as #1 above
 Same as #2 above
 Same as #3 above
 Same as #4 above
 Same as #5 above
 Prince Charles of Hesse and by Rhine (1809–1877) m. Princess Elisabeth of Prussia
 Louis IV, Grand Duke of Hesse (1837–1892) m. Princess Alice of the United Kingdom
 Princess Victoria of Hesse and by Rhine (1863–1950) m. Prince Louis of Battenberg
 Same as #8 above
 Same as #9 above
 Same as #10 above
 Same as #11 above
 References:

 Same as #1 above
 Same as #2 in the first list
 Charles Frederick, Grand Duke of Baden (1728–1811) m. Louise Caroline Geyer von Geyersberg
 Charles Louis, Hereditary Prince of Baden (1755–1801) m. Princess Amalie of Hesse-Darmstadt
 Caroline of Baden (1776–1841) m. Maximilian I Joseph of Bavaria
 Princess Sophie of Bavaria (1805–1872) m. Archduke Franz Karl of Austria
 Franz Joseph I of Austria (1830–1916) m. Duchess Elisabeth in Bavaria
 Archduchess Marie Valerie of Austria (1868–1924) m. Archduke Franz Salvator of Austria
 Archduke Hubert Salvator of Austria (1894–1971) m. Princess Rosemary of Salm-Salm
 Archduchess Valerie of Austria (1941–) m. Maximilian, Margrave of Baden
 Same as #12 above

 Same as #1 above
 Same as #2 above
 Same as #3 above
 Same as #4 above
 Same as #5 above
 Princess Ludovika of Bavaria (1808–1892) m. Duke Maximilian Joseph in Bavaria
 Duchess Elisabeth in Bavaria (1837–1898) m. Franz Joseph I of Austria
 Same as #8 above
 Same as #9 above
 Same as #10 above
 Same as #11 above

 Same as #1 above
 William IV, Prince of Orange (1711–1751) m. Anne, Princess Royal
 Princess Carolina of Orange-Nassau (1743–1787) m. Charles Christian, Prince of Nassau-Weilburg
 Frederick William, Prince of Nassau-Weilburg (1768–1816) m. Burgravine Louise Isabella of Kirchberg
 Princess Henrietta of Nassau-Weilburg (1797–1829) m. Archduke Charles, Duke of Teschen
 Maria Theresa of Austria (1816–1867) m. Ferdinand II of the Two Sicilies
 Princess Maria Immacolata of Bourbon-Two Sicilies (1844–1899) m. Archduke Karl Salvator of Austria
 Archduke Franz Salvator of Austria (1866–1939) m. Archduchess Marie Valerie of Austria
 Same as #9 above
 Same as #10 above
 Same as #11 above

 Same as #1 above
 Same as #2 above
 Same as #3 above
 Same as #4 above
 Same as #5 above
 Archduke Karl Ferdinand of Austria (1818–1874) m. Archduchess Elisabeth Franziska of Austria
 Archduke Friedrich, Duke of Teschen (1856–1936) m. Princess Isabella of Croÿ
 Archduchess Maria Christina of Austria (1879–1962) m. Emanuel, Hereditary Prince of Salm-Salm
 Princess Rosemary of Salm-Salm (1904–2001) m. Archduke Hubert Salvator of Austria
 Same as #10 above
 Same as #11 above

 Same as #1 above
 Same as #2 above
 Same as #3 above
 Princess Henriette of Nassau-Weilburg (1780–1857) m. Duke Louis of Württemberg
 Duchess Maria Dorothea of Württemberg (1797–1855) m. Archduke Joseph of Austria
 Archduchess Elisabeth Franziska of Austria (1831–1903) m. Archduke Karl Ferdinand of Austria
 Same as #7 above
 Same as #8 above
 Same as #9 above
 Same as #10 above
 Same as #11 above

Bavaria

King Ludwig III of Bavaria, the last reigning Bavarian monarch, was not descended from Friso, but his son, Rupprecht, Crown Prince of Bavaria, was through Friso's son's daughter:
 John William Friso, Prince of Orange (1687–1711) m. Landgravine Marie Louise of Hesse-Kassel
 William IV, Prince of Orange (1711–1751) m. Anne, Princess Royal
 Princess Carolina of Orange-Nassau (1743–1787) m. Charles Christian, Prince of Nassau-Weilburg
 Princess Henriette of Nassau-Weilburg (1780–1857) m. Duke Louis of Württemberg
 Duchess Maria Dorothea of Württemberg (1797–1855) m. Archduke Joseph, Palatine of Hungary
 Archduchess Elisabeth Franziska of Austria (1831–1903) m. Archduke Ferdinand Karl Viktor of Austria-Este
 Archduchess Maria Theresa of Austria-Este (1849–1919) m. Ludwig III of Bavaria
 Rupprecht, Crown Prince of Bavaria (1869–1955) m. Duchess Marie Gabrielle in Bavaria – pretender
 Albrecht, Duke of Bavaria (1905–1996) m. Countess Maria Draskovich of Trakostjan – pretender
 Franz, Duke of Bavaria (1933–) – pretender

The current pretender also descends from Friso through his daughter's son:

 Same as #1 above
 Princess Amalia of Nassau-Dietz (1710–1777) m. Frederick, Hereditary Prince of Baden-Durlach
 Charles Frederick, Grand Duke of Baden (1728–1811) m. Landgravine Caroline Louise of Hesse-Darmstadt
 Charles Louis, Hereditary Prince of Baden (1755–1801) m. Princess Amalie of Hesse-Darmstadt
 Caroline of Baden (1776–1841) m. Maximilian I Joseph of Bavaria
 Princess Ludovika of Bavaria (1808–1892) m. Duke Maximilian Joseph in Bavaria
 Karl Theodor, Duke in Bavaria (1839–1909) m. Infanta Maria Josepha of Portugal
 Duchess Marie Gabrielle in Bavaria (1839–1909) m. Rupprecht, Crown Prince of Bavaria
 Same as #9 above
 Same as #10 above

The Dukes of Bavaria, beginning with Rupprecht, are also the heirs to the Jacobite claim to the British thrones.
 Reference:

Brunswick

Ernest Augustus, Duke of Brunswick, the last reigning Duke of Brunswick, was descended from Friso through his son's daughter:
 John William Friso, Prince of Orange (1687–1711) m. Landgravine Marie Louise of Hesse-Kassel
 William IV, Prince of Orange (1711–1751) m. Anne, Princess Royal
 Princess Carolina of Orange-Nassau (1743–1787) m. Charles Christian, Prince of Nassau-Weilburg
 Princess Henriette of Nassau-Weilburg (1780–1857) m. Duke Louis of Württemberg
 Duchess Amelia of Württemberg (1799–1848) m. Joseph, Duke of Saxe-Altenburg
 Princess Marie of Saxe-Altenburg (1818–1907) m. George V of Hanover
 Ernest Augustus, Crown Prince of Hanover (1845–1923) m. Princess Thyra of Denmark
 Ernest Augustus, Duke of Brunswick (1887–1953) m. Princess Victoria Louise of Prussia
 Prince Ernest Augustus of Hanover (1914–1987) m. Princess Ortrud of Schleswig-Holstein-Sonderburg-Glücksburg – pretender
 Prince Ernest Augustus of Hanover (1954–) m. Chantal Hochuli – pretender
 Reference:

Hesse and the Rhine

Ernest Louis, Grand Duke of Hesse, the last reigning Grand Duke of Hesse and by Rhine, was descended from Friso through his daughter's son:
 John William Friso, Prince of Orange (1687–1711) m. Landgravine Marie Louise of Hesse-Kassel
 Princess Amalia of Nassau-Dietz (1710–1777) m. Frederick, Hereditary Prince of Baden-Durlach
 Charles Frederick, Grand Duke of Baden (1728–1811) m. Landgravine Caroline Louise of Hesse-Darmstadt
 Charles Louis, Hereditary Prince of Baden (1755–1801) m. Princess Amalie of Hesse-Darmstadt
 Princess Wilhelmine of Baden (1788–1836) m. Louis II, Grand Duke of Hesse
 Prince Charles of Hesse and by Rhine (1809–1877) m. Princess Elisabeth of Prussia
 Louis IV, Grand Duke of Hesse (1837–1892) m. Princess Alice of the United Kingdom
 Ernest Louis, Grand Duke of Hesse (1868–1937) m. Princess Eleonore of Solms-Hohensolms-Lich
 Louis, Prince of Hesse and by Rhine (1906–1937) m. Margaret Campbell-Geddes – pretender

Upon Louis's death, his cousin Philipp, Landgrave of Hesse became the pretender. Even though he was not descended from Friso, he married the daughter of King Victor Emmanuel of Italy, Princess Mafalda of Savoy, a descendant of Friso's daughter's son. Therefore, their grandson, the current pretender Donatus, Landgrave of Hesse is Friso's descendant:

 Same as #1 above
 Same as #2 above
 Same as #3 above
 Same as #4 above
 Princess Caroline of Baden (1776–1841) m. Maximilian I Joseph of Bavaria
 Princess Amalie Auguste of Baden (1801–1877) m. John of Saxony
 Princess Elisabeth of Saxony (1830–1912) m. Prince Ferdinand, Duke of Genoa
 Princess Margherita of Savoy (1851–1926) m. Umberto I of Italy
 Victor Emmanuel III of Italy (1869–1947) m. Princess Elena of Montenegro
 Princess Mafalda of Savoy (1902–1944) m. Philipp, Landgrave of Hesse
 Moritz, Landgrave of Hesse (1926–2013) m. Princess Tatiana of Sayn-Wittgenstein-Berleburg – pretender
 Donatus, Landgrave of Hesse (1966–) m. Countess Floria von Faber-Castell – pretender
 Reference:

He is also a descendent through his mother
 Same as #1 above
 Same as #2 above
 Same as #3 above
 Louis I, Grand Duke of Baden (1763–1830) w. Katharina Werner
 Countess Louise von Langenstein und Gondelsheim (1825–1900) m. Count Carl Israel Douglas
 Ludvig Douglas (1849–1916) m. Countess Anna Louise Dorotea
 Countess Madeleine Douglas (1886–1983) m. Charles-Louis Fouché d'Otrante
 Margareta Fouché (1909–2005) m. Gustav Albrecht, 5th Prince of Sayn-Wittgenstein-Berleburg
 Princess Tatiana of Sayn-Wittgenstein-Berleburg (1940–) m. Moritz, Landgrave of Hesse
 Same as #12 above

Mecklenburg-Schwerin

Frederick Francis IV, Grand Duke of Mecklenburg-Schwerin was descended from Friso through his daughter's son in two ways:
 John William Friso, Prince of Orange (1687–1711) m. Landgravine Marie Louise of Hesse-Kassel
 Princess Amalia of Nassau-Dietz (1710–1777) m. Frederick, Hereditary Prince of Baden-Durlach
 Charles Frederick, Grand Duke of Baden (1728–1811) m. Louise Caroline Geyer von Geyersberg
 Leopold, Grand Duke of Baden (1790–1852) m. Princess Sophie of Sweden
 Princess Cecilie of Baden (1839–1891) m. Grand Duke Michael Nikolaevich of Russia
 Grand Duchess Anastasia Mikhailovna of Russia (1860–1922) m. Frederick Francis III, Grand Duke of Mecklenburg-Schwerin
 Frederick Francis IV, Grand Duke of Mecklenburg-Schwerin (1882–1945) m. Princess Alexandra of Hanover
 Friedrich Franz, Hereditary Grand Duke of Mecklenburg-Schwerin (1910–2001) m. Karin Elisabeth von Schaper – pretender

 Same as #1 above
 Same as #2 above
 Same as #3 above, but m. Landgravine Caroline Louise of Hesse-Darmstadt
 Charles Louis, Hereditary Prince of Baden (1755–1801) m. Princess Amalie of Hesse-Darmstadt
 Princess Frederica of Baden (1781–1826) m. Gustav IV Adolf of Sweden
 Princess Sophie of Sweden (1801–1865) m. Leopold, Grand Duke of Baden
 Same as #5 above
 Same as #6 above
 Same as #7 above
 Same as #8 above

His son and heir also descended from Friso through his mother:

 Same as #1 above
 William IV, Prince of Orange (1711–1751) m. Anne, Princess Royal
 Princess Carolina of Orange-Nassau (1743–1787) m. Charles Christian, Prince of Nassau-Weilburg
 Princess Henriette of Nassau-Weilburg (1780–1857) m. Duke Louis of Württemberg
 Duchess Amelia of Württemberg (1799–1848) m. Joseph, Duke of Saxe-Altenburg
 Princess Marie of Saxe-Altenburg (1818–1907) m. George V of Hanover
 Ernest Augustus, Crown Prince of Hanover (1845–1923) m. Princess Thyra of Denmark
 Princess Alexandra of Hanover (1882–1963) m. Frederick Francis IV, Grand Duke of Mecklenburg-Schwerin
 Same as #10 above

Upon Friedrich Franz's death, the line became extinct. The headship passed to the head of the House of Mecklenburg-Strelitz, who descends from Friso in multiple ways:
 Reference:

 John William Friso, Prince of Orange (1687–1711) m. Landgravine Marie Louise of Hesse-Kassel
 Princess Amalia of Nassau-Dietz (1710–1777) m. Frederick, Hereditary Prince of Baden-Durlach
 Charles Frederick, Grand Duke of Baden (1728–1811) m. Landgravine Caroline Louise of Hesse-Darmstadt
 Charles Louis, Hereditary Prince of Baden (1755–1801) m. Princess Amalie of Hesse-Darmstadt
 Caroline of Baden (1776–1841) m. Maximilian I Joseph of Bavaria
 Amalie Auguste of Bavaria (1801–1877) m. John of Saxony
 George, King of Saxony (1832–1904) m. Infanta Maria Ana of Portugal
 Frederick Augustus III of Saxony (1865–1932) m. Archduchess Louise of Austria
 Princess Anna of Saxony (1903–1976) m. Archduke Joseph Francis of Austria
 Archduchess Ilona of Austria (1927–2011) m. Georg Alexander, Duke of Mecklenburg
 Borwin, Duke of Mecklenburg (1956–) m. Alice Wagner – pretender

 Same as #1 above
 Same as #2 above
 Same as #3 above
 Same as #4 above
 Same as #5 above
 Princess Sophie of Bavaria (1801–1877) m. Archduke Franz Karl of Austria
 Franz Joseph I of Austria (1830–1916) m. Duchess Elisabeth in Bavaria
 Archduchess Gisela of Austria (1856–1932) m. Prince Leopold of Bavaria
 Princess Auguste of Bavaria (1875–1964) m. Archduke Joseph August of Austria
 Archduke Joseph Francis of Austria (1895–1957) m. Princess Anna of Saxony
 Same as #10 above
 Same as #11 above

 Same as #1 above
 Same as #2 above
 Same as #3 above
 Same as #4 above
 Same as #5 above
 Princess Ludovika of Bavaria (1808–1892) m. Duke Maximilian Joseph in Bavaria
 Duchess Elisabeth in Bavaria (1837–1898) m. Franz Joseph I of Austria
 Same as #8 above
 Same as #9 above
 Same as #10 above
 Same as #11 above
 Same as #12 above

 Same as #1 above
 William IV, Prince of Orange (1711–1751) m. Anne, Princess Royal
 Princess Carolina of Orange-Nassau (1743–1787) m. Charles Christian, Prince of Nassau-Weilburg
 Princess Henriette of Nassau-Weilburg (1780–1857) m. Duke Louis of Württemberg
 Duchess Maria Dorothea of Württemberg (1797–1855) m. Archduke Joseph of Austria
 Archduke Joseph Karl of Austria (1833–1905) m. Princess Clotilde of Saxe-Coburg and Gotha
 Archduke Joseph August of Austria (1872–1962) m. Princess Auguste of Bavaria
 Same as #10 above
 Same as #11 above
 Same as #12 above

Oldenburg

Frederick Augustus II, Grand Duke of Oldenburg, the last reigning Grand Duke of Oldenburg, was descended from Friso twice through his son's daughter:
 John William Friso, Prince of Orange (1687–1711) m. Landgravine Marie Louise of Hesse-Kassel
 William IV, Prince of Orange (1711–1751) m. Anne, Princess Royal
 Princess Carolina of Orange-Nassau (1743–1787) m. Charles Christian, Prince of Nassau-Weilburg
 Princess Henriette of Nassau-Weilburg (1780–1857) m. Duke Louis of Württemberg
 Duchess Amelia of Württemberg (1799–1848) m. Joseph, Duke of Saxe-Altenburg
 Princess Elisabeth of Saxe-Altenburg (1826–1896) m. Peter II, Grand Duke of Oldenburg
 Frederick Augustus II, Grand Duke of Oldenburg (1852–1931) m. Duchess Elisabeth Alexandrine of Mecklenburg-Schwerin
 Nikolaus, Hereditary Grand Duke of Oldenburg (1897–1970) m. Princess Helena of Waldeck and Pyrmont – pretender
 Anton-Günther, Duke of Oldenburg (1923–2014) m. Princess Ameli of Löwenstein-Wertheim-Freudenberg - pretender
 Christian, Duke of Oldenburg (1955–) m. Countess Caroline zu Rantzau - pretender

 Same as #1 above
 Same as #2 above
 Same as #3 above
 Frederick William, Prince of Nassau-Weilburg (1768–1816) m. Burgravine Louise Isabelle of Kirchberg
 Princess Ida of Anhalt-Bernburg-Schaumburg-Hoym (1804–1828) m. Augustus, Grand Duke of Oldenburg
 Peter II, Grand Duke of Oldenburg (1827–1900) m. Princess Elisabeth of Saxe-Altenburg
 Same as #7 above
 Same as #8 above
 Same as #9 above
 Same as #10 above

Anton-Günther is also descended from Friso's son's daughter through his mother in two ways:
 Same as #1 above
 Same as #2 above
 Same as #3 above
 Same as #4 above
 William, Duke of Nassau (1792–1839) m. Princess Pauline of Württemberg
 Princess Helena of Nassau (1831–1888) m. George Victor, Prince of Waldeck and Pyrmont
 Friedrich, Prince of Waldeck and Pyrmont (1865–1946) m. Princess Bathildis of Schaumburg-Lippe
 Princess Helena of Waldeck and Pyrmont (1899–1948) m. Nikolaus, Hereditary Grand Duke of Oldenburg
 Same as #9 above
 Same as #10 above

 Same as #1 above
 Same as #2 above
 Same as #3 above
 Princess Amelia of Nassau-Weilburg (1776–1841) m. Victor II, Prince of Anhalt-Bernburg-Schaumburg-Hoym
 Princess Emma of Anhalt-Bernburg-Schaumburg-Hoym (1802–1858) m. George II, Prince of Waldeck and Pyrmont
 George Victor, Prince of Waldeck and Pyrmont (1831–1893) m. Princess Helena of Nassau
 Same as #7 above
 Same as #8 above
 Same as #9 above
 Same as #10 above
 Reference:

Prussia

Wilhelm II of Germany, the last Kaiser, was not descended from Friso, but his grandson Louis Ferdinand, Prince of Prussia was descended from Friso's daughter's son in two ways:
 John William Friso, Prince of Orange (1687–1711) m. Landgravine Marie Louise of Hesse-Kassel
 Princess Amalia of Nassau-Dietz (1710–1777) m. Frederick, Hereditary Prince of Baden-Durlach
 Charles Frederick, Grand Duke of Baden (1728–1811) m. Louise Caroline Geyer von Geyersberg
 Leopold, Grand Duke of Baden (1790–1852) m. Princess Sophie of Sweden
 Princess Cecilie of Baden (1839–1891) m. Grand Duke Michael Nikolaevich of Russia
 Grand Duchess Anastasia Mikhailovna of Russia (1860–1922) m. Frederick Francis III, Grand Duke of Mecklenburg-Schwerin
 Duchess Cecilie of Mecklenburg-Schwerin (1886–1954) m. Wilhelm, German Crown Prince
 Louis Ferdinand, Prince of Prussia (1907–1994) m. Grand Duchess Kira Kirillovna of Russia – pretender
 Prince Louis Ferdinand of Prussia (1944–1977) m. Countess Donata of Castell-Rüdenhausen
 Georg Friedrich, Prince of Prussia (1976–) m. Princess Sophie of Isenburg

 Same as #1 above
 Same as #2 above
 Same as #3 above, but m. Landgravine Caroline Louise of Hesse-Darmstadt
 Charles Louis, Hereditary Prince of Baden (1755–1801) m. Princess Amalie of Hesse-Darmstadt
 Princess Frederica of Baden (1781–1826) m. Gustav IV Adolf of Sweden
 Princess Sophie of Sweden (1801–1865) m. Leopold, Grand Duke of Baden
 Same as #5 above
 Same as #6 above
 Same as #7 above
 Same as #8 above
 Same as #9 above
 Same as #10 above

Georg Friedrich, the current pretender, is additionally descended from Friso's daughter's son in two additional ways:
 Same as #1 above
 Same as #2 above
 Same as #3 above
 Same as #4 above
 Princess Wilhelmine of Baden (1788–1836) m. Louis II, Grand Duke of Hesse
 Princess Marie of Hesse and by Rhine (1824–1880) m. Alexander II of Russia
 Grand Duke Vladimir Alexandrovich of Russia (1847–1909) m. Duchess Marie of Mecklenburg-Schwerin
 Grand Duke Cyril Vladimirovich of Russia (1876–1938) m. Princess Victoria Melita of Saxe-Coburg and Gotha
 Grand Duchess Kira Kirillovna of Russia (1909–1967) m. Louis Ferdinand, Prince of Prussia
 Same as #11 above
 Same as #12 above
 Reference:

 Same as #1 above
 Same as #2 above
 Same as #3 above
 Same as #4 above
 Same as #5 above
 Same as #6 above
 Grand Duchess Maria Alexandrovna of Russia (1853–1920) m. Alfred, Duke of Saxe-Coburg and Gotha
 Princess Victoria Melita of Saxe-Coburg and Gotha (1876–1936) m. Grand Duke Kirill Vladimirovich of Russia
 Same as #9 above
 Same as #10 above
 Same as #11 above
 Same as #12 above

Reuss-Gera
Although the last reigning Prince Reuss-Gera, Heinrich XXVII, Prince Reuss Younger Line, was not a descendant of Friso, his son the last Hereditary Prince, was a descendant twice over:
 John William Friso, Prince of Orange (1687–1711) m. Landgravine Marie Louise of Hesse-Kassel
 William IV, Prince of Orange (1711–1751) m. Anne, Princess Royal
 Princess Carolina of Orange-Nassau (1743–1787) m. Charles Christian, Prince of Nassau-Weilburg
 Princess Henriette of Nassau-Weilburg (1780–1857) m. Duke Louis of Württemberg
 Duchess Elisabeth Alexandrine of Württemberg (1802–1864) m. Prince William of Baden
 Princess Leopoldine of Baden (1837–1903) m. Hermann, Prince of Hohenlohe-Langenburg
 Princess Elise of Hohenlohe-Langenburg (1864–1929) m. Heinrich XXVII, Prince Reuss Younger Line
 Heinrich XLV, Hereditary Prince Reuss Younger Line (1895–1945) - pretender
 Reference:

 Same as #1 above
 Princess Amalia of Nassau-Dietz (1710–1777) m. Frederick, Hereditary Prince of Baden-Durlach
 Charles Frederick, Grand Duke of Baden (1728–1811) m. Louise Caroline of Hochberg
 Prince William of Baden (1792–1859) m. Duchess Elisabeth Alexandrine of Württemberg
 Same as #6 above
 Same as #7 above
 Same as #8 above

The current pretender is also a descendent:

 Same as #1 above
 William IV, Prince of Orange (1711–1751) m. Anne, Princess Royal
 Princess Carolina of Orange-Nassau (1743–1787) m. Charles Christian, Prince of Nassau-Weilburg
 Louise, Princess Reuss of Greiz (1765–1837) m. Heinrich XIII, Prince Reuss of Greiz
 Heinrich XIX, Prince Reuss of Greiz (1790–1836) m. Princess Gasparine of Rohan-Rochefort
 Princess Luise Caroline Reuss-Greiz (1822–1875) m. Heinrich IV, Prince Reuss-Köstritz
 Prince Heinrich XXIV Reuss of Köstritz (1855–1910) m. Princess Elisabeth Reuss of Köstritz
 Prince Heinrich XXXIX Reuss (1891–1946) m. Countess Antonia of Castell-Castell
 Heinrich IV, Prince Reuss of Köstritz (1919–2012) m. Princess Marie Luise of Salm-Horstmar - pretender
 Heinrich XIV, Prince Reuss of Köstritz (1955–) m. Baroness Johanna Raitz von Frentz - pretender

Reuss-Greiz

Heinrich XXIV, Prince Reuss of Greiz, the last reigning Prince Reuss of Greiz, descended from Friso through his son's daughter twice:
 John William Friso, Prince of Orange (1687–1711) m. Landgravine Marie Louise of Hesse-Kassel
 William IV, Prince of Orange (1711–1751) m. Anne, Princess Royal and Princess of Orange
 Princess Carolina of Orange-Nassau (1743–1787) m. Charles Christian, Prince of Nassau-Weilburg
 Princess Amelia of Nassau-Weilburg (1776–1841) m. Victor II, Prince of Anhalt-Bernburg-Schaumburg-Hoym
 Princess Emma of Anhalt-Bernburg-Schaumburg-Hoym (1802–1858) m. George II, Prince of Waldeck and Pyrmont
 Princess Hermine of Waldeck and Pyrmont (1827–1910) m. Adolf I, Prince of Schaumburg-Lippe
 Princess Ida of Schaumburg-Lippe (1852–1891) m. Heinrich XXII, Prince Reuss of Greiz
 Heinrich XXIV, Prince Reuss of Greiz (1878–1927)
 Reference:

 Same as #1 above
 Same as #2 above
 Same as #3 above
 Louise, Princess Reuss of Greiz (1765–1837) m. Heinrich XIII, Prince Reuss of Greiz
 Heinrich XX, Prince Reuss of Greiz (1794–1859) m. Princess Caroline of Hesse-Homburg
 Heinrich XXII, Prince Reuss of Greiz (1846–1902) m. Princess Ida of Schaumburg-Lippe
 Same as #8 above

Saxe-Coburg-Gotha

Charles Edward, Duke of Saxe-Coburg and Gotha, the last reigning Duke of Saxe-Coburg-Gotha, was descended from Friso through his son's daughter in two ways:
 John William Friso, Prince of Orange (1687–1711) m. Landgravine Marie Louise of Hesse-Kassel
 William IV, Prince of Orange (1711–1751) m. Anne, Princess Royal
 Princess Carolina of Orange-Nassau (1743–1787) m. Charles Christian, Prince of Nassau-Weilburg
 Princess Amelia of Nassau-Weilburg (1776–1841) m. Victor II, Prince of Anhalt-Bernburg-Schaumburg-Hoym
 Princess Emma of Anhalt-Bernburg-Schaumburg-Hoym (1802–1858) m. George II, Prince of Waldeck and Pyrmont
 George Victor, Prince of Waldeck and Pyrmont (1831–1893) m. Princess Helena of Nassau
 Princess Helena of Waldeck and Pyrmont (1861–1922) m. Prince Leopold, Duke of Albany
 Charles Edward, Duke of Saxe-Coburg and Gotha (1884–1954) m. Princess Victoria Adelaide of Schleswig-Holstein
 Friedrich Josias, Prince of Saxe-Coburg and Gotha (1918–1998) m. Countess Viktoria-Luise of Solms-Baruth – pretender
 Andreas, Prince of Saxe-Coburg and Gotha (1943–) m. Carin Dabelstein – pretender

 Same as #1 above
 Same as #2 above
 Same as #3 above
 Frederick William, Prince of Nassau-Weilburg (1768–1816) m. Burgravine Louise Isabelle of Kirchberg
 William, Duke of Nassau (1792–1839) m. Princess Pauline of Württemberg
 Princess Helena of Nassau (1831–1888) m. George Victor, Prince of Waldeck and Pyrmont
 Same as #7 above
 Same as #8 above
 Same as #9 above
 Same as #10 above
 Reference:

Saxe-Meiningen

Bernhard III, Duke of Saxe-Meiningen, the last reigning Duke of Saxe-Meiningen, descended from Friso through his son's son:
 John William Friso, Prince of Orange (1687–1711) m. Landgravine Marie Louise of Hesse-Kassel
 William IV, Prince of Orange (1711–1751) m. Anne, Princess Royal
 William V, Prince of Orange (1748–1806) m. Princess Wilhelmina of Prussia
 William I of the Netherlands (1772–1843) m. Princess Wilhelmina of Prussia
 Princess Marianne of the Netherlands (1810–1883) m. Prince Albert of Prussia
 Princess Charlotte of Prussia (1831–1855) m. Georg II, Duke of Saxe-Meiningen
 Bernhard III, Duke of Saxe-Meiningen (1851–1928) m. Princess Charlotte of Prussia
 Reference:

Saxe-Weimar-Eisenach

William Ernest, Grand Duke of Saxe-Weimar-Eisenach, the last monarch of Saxe-Weimar-Eisenach, was descended from Friso through both children of his son:
 John William Friso, Prince of Orange (1687–1711) m. Landgravine Marie Louise of Hesse-Kassel
 William IV, Prince of Orange (1711–1751) m. Anne, Princess Royal
 William V, Prince of Orange (1748–1806) m. Princess Wilhelmina of Prussia
 William I of the Netherlands (1772–1843) m. Princess Wilhelmina of Prussia
 William II of the Netherlands (1792–1849) m. Grand Duchess Anna Pavlovna of Russia
 Princess Sophie of the Netherlands (1824–1897) m. Charles Alexander, Grand Duke of Saxe-Weimar-Eisenach
 Charles Augustus, Hereditary Grand Duke of Saxe-Weimar-Eisenach (1844–1894) m. Princess Pauline of Saxe-Weimar-Eisenach
 William Ernest, Grand Duke of Saxe-Weimar-Eisenach (1876–1923) m. Princess Feodora of Saxe-Meiningen
 Charles Augustus, Hereditary Grand Duke of Saxe-Weimar-Eisenach (1912–1988) m. Baroness Elisabeth of Wangenheim-Winterstein – pretender
 Michael, Prince of Saxe-Weimar-Eisenach (1946–) m. Renate Henkel – pretender

 Same as #1 above
 Same as #2 above
 Princess Carolina of Orange-Nassau (1743–1787) m. Charles Christian, Prince of Nassau-Weilburg
 Princess Henriette of Nassau-Weilburg (1780–1857) m. Duke Louis of Württemberg
 Duchess Pauline Therese of Württemberg (1800–1873) m. William I of Württemberg
 Princess Augusta of Württemberg (1826–1898) m. Prince Hermann of Saxe-Weimar-Eisenach
 Princess Pauline of Saxe-Weimar-Eisenach (1852–1904) m. Charles Augustus, Hereditary Grand Duke of Saxe-Weimar-Eisenach
 Same as #8 above
 Same as #9 above
 Same as #10 above
 Reference:

Saxony

Frederick Augustus III of Saxony, the last reigning King of Saxony, was a descendant of Friso through his daughter's son. Two of his descendants are pretenders to the throne. One of the pretenders also descends from Friso through other lines:
 John William Friso, Prince of Orange (1687–1711) m. Landgravine Marie Louise of Hesse-Kassel
 Princess Amalia of Nassau-Dietz (1710–1777) m. Frederick, Hereditary Prince of Baden-Durlach
 Charles Frederick, Grand Duke of Baden (1728–1811) m. Princess Caroline Louise of Hesse-Darmstadt
 Charles Louis, Hereditary Prince of Baden (1755–1801) m. Princess Amalie of Hesse-Darmstadt
 Princess Caroline of Baden (1776–1841) m. Maximilian I Joseph of Bavaria
 Princess Amalie Auguste of Bavaria (1801–1877) m. John of Saxony
 George, King of Saxony (1832–1904) m. Infanta Maria Anna of Portugal
 Frederick Augustus III of Saxony (1865–1932) m. Archduchess Louise of Austria
 Friedrich Christian, Margrave of Meissen (1893–1968) m. Princess Elisabeth Helene of Thurn and Taxis - pretender
 Princess Anna of Saxony (1929–2012) m. Roberto de Afif
 Alexander, Prince of Saxony (1954–) m. Princess Gisela of Bavaria - pretender

 Same as #1 above
 Same as #2 above
 Same as #3 above
 Same as #4 above
 Same as #5 above
 Princess Ludovika of Bavaria (1808–1892) m. Duke Maximilian Joseph in Bavaria
 Duchess Helene in Bavaria (1834–1890) m. Maximilian Anton, Hereditary Prince of Thurn and Taxis
 Albert, 8th Prince of Thurn and Taxis (1867–1952) m. Archduchess Margarethe Klementine of Austria
 Princess Elisabeth Helene of Thurn and Taxis (1903–1976) m. Friedrich Christian, Margrave of Meissen
 Same as #10 above
 Same as #11 above

 Same as #1 above
 William IV, Prince of Orange (1711–1751) m. Anne, Princess Royal and Princess of Orange
 Princess Carolina of Orange-Nassau (1743–1787) m. Charles Christian, Prince of Nassau-Weilburg
 Princess Henriette of Nassau-Weilburg (1780–1857) m. Duke Louis of Württemberg
 Duchess Maria Dorothea of Württemberg (1797–1855) m. Archduke Joseph, Palatine of Hungary
 Archduke Joseph Karl of Austria (1833–1905) m. Princess Clotilde of Saxe-Coburg and Gotha
 Archduchess Margarethe Klementine of Austria (1870–1955) m. Albert, 8th Prince of Thurn and Taxis
 Same as #9 above
 Same as #10 above
 Same as #11 above

Alexander's wife Gisela is also a descendent of Friso:

 Same as #1 above
 Same as #2 above
 Same as #3 above
 Same as #4 above
 Same as #5 above
 Archduchess Elisabeth Franziska of Austria (1831–1903) m. Archduke Ferdinand Karl Viktor of Austria-Este
 Archduchess Maria Theresa of Austria-Este (1849–1919) m. Ludwig III of Bavaria
 Prince Franz of Bavaria (1875–1957) m. Princess Isabella Antonie of Croÿ 
 Prince Rasso of Bavaria (1926–2011) m. Archduchess Theresa of Austria
 Princess Gisela of Bavaria (1964–) m. Alexander, Prince of Saxony

 Same as #1 above
 Same as #2 above
 Same as #3 above
 Frederick William, Prince of Nassau-Weilburg (1768–1816) m. Burgravine Louise Isabella of Kirchberg
 Princess Henrietta of Nassau-Weilburg (1797–1829) m. Archduke Charles, Duke of Teschen
 Maria Theresa of Austria (1816–1867) m. Ferdinand II of the Two Sicilies
 Princess Maria Immacolata of Bourbon-Two Sicilies (1844–1899) m. Archduke Karl Salvator of Austria
 Archduke Franz Salvator of Austria (1866–1939) m. Archduchess Marie Valerie of Austria
 Archduke Theodor Salvator of Austria (1899–1978) m. Countess Maria Theresa von Waldburg zu Zeil und Trauchburg
 Archduchess Theresa of Austria (1931–) m. Prince Rasso of Bavaria
 Same as #11 above

 Same as #1 above
 Princess Amalia of Nassau-Dietz (1710–1777) m. Frederick, Hereditary Prince of Baden-Durlach
 Charles Frederick, Grand Duke of Baden (1728–1811) m. Louise Caroline Geyer von Geyersberg
 Charles Louis, Hereditary Prince of Baden (1755–1801) m. Princess Amalie of Hesse-Darmstadt
 Caroline of Baden (1776–1841) m. Maximilian I Joseph of Bavaria
 Princess Sophie of Bavaria (1805–1872) m. Archduke Franz Karl of Austria
 Franz Joseph I of Austria (1830–1916) m. Duchess Elisabeth in Bavaria
 Archduchess Marie Valerie of Austria (1868–1924) m. Archduke Franz Salvator of Austria
 Same as #9 above
 Same as #10 above
 Same as #11 above

 Same as #1 above
 Same as #2 above
 Same as #3 above
 Same as #4 above
 Same as #5 above
 Princess Ludovika of Bavaria (1808–1892) m. Duke Maximilian Joseph in Bavaria
 Duchess Elisabeth in Bavaria (1837–1898) m. Franz Joseph I of Austria
 Same as #8 above
 Same as #9 above
 Same as #10 above
 Same as #11 above

The other pretender descends from Friso twice:
 John William Friso, Prince of Orange (1687–1711) m. Landgravine Marie Louise of Hesse-Kassel
 Princess Amalia of Nassau-Dietz (1710–1777) m. Frederick, Hereditary Prince of Baden-Durlach
 Charles Frederick, Grand Duke of Baden (1728–1811) m. Princess Caroline Louise of Hesse-Darmstadt
 Charles Louis, Hereditary Prince of Baden (1755–1801) m. Princess Amalie of Hesse-Darmstadt
 Princess Caroline of Baden (1776–1841) m. Maximilian I Joseph of Bavaria
 Princess Amalie Auguste of Bavaria (1801–1977) m. John of Saxony
 George, King of Saxony (1832–1904) m. Infanta Maria Anna of Portugal
 Frederick Augustus III of Saxony (1865–1932) m. Archduchess Louise of Austria
 Prince Ernst Heinrich of Saxony (1896–1971) m. Princess Sophie of Luxembourg
 Prince Timo of Saxony (1923–1982) m. Margrit Lucas
 Rüdiger, Margrave of Meissen (1953–2022) m. Astrid Linke - pretender
 Daniel, Margrave of Meissen (1975–) m. Sandra Scherer - pretender

 Same as #1 above
 William IV, Prince of Orange (1711–1751) m. Anne, Princess Royal and Princess of Orange
 Princess Carolina of Orange-Nassau (1743–1787) m. Charles Christian, Prince of Nassau-Weilburg
 Frederick William, Prince of Nassau-Weilburg (1768–1816) m. Burgravine Louise Isabelle of Kirchberg
 William, Duke of Nassau (1792–1839) m. Princess Louise of Saxe-Hildburghausen
 Adolphe, Grand Duke of Luxembourg (1817–1905) m. Princess Adelheid-Marie of Anhalt-Dessau
 William IV, Grand Duke of Luxembourg (1852–1912) m. Infanta Marie Anne of Portugal
 Princess Sophie of Luxembourg (1902–1941) m. Prince Ernst Heinrich of Saxony
 Same as #10 above
 Same as #11 above
 Same as #12 above
 References:

Schaumburg-Lippe

Adolf II, Prince of Schaumburg-Lippe, the last reigning Prince of Schaumburg-Lippe, was descended from Friso through his son's daughter:
 John William Friso, Prince of Orange (1687–1711) m. Landgravine Marie Louise of Hesse-Kassel
 William IV, Prince of Orange (1711–1751) m. Anne, Princess Royal
 Princess Carolina of Orange-Nassau (1743–1787) m. Charles Christian, Prince of Nassau-Weilburg
 Princess Amelia of Nassau-Weilburg (1776–1841) m. Victor II, Prince of Anhalt-Bernburg-Schaumburg-Hoym
 Princess Emma of Anhalt-Bernburg-Schaumburg-Hoym (1802–1858) m. George II, Prince of Waldeck and Pyrmont
 Princess Hermine of Waldeck and Pyrmont (1827–1910) m. Adolf I, Prince of Schaumburg-Lippe
 Georg, Prince of Schaumburg-Lippe (1846–1911) m. Princess Marie Anne of Saxe-Altenburg
 Adolf II, Prince of Schaumburg-Lippe (1883–1936) m. Ellen Bischoff-Korthaus

Upon Adolf's death, his brother Wolrad became the pretender, his descent is shown here:
 Same as #1 above
 Same as #2 above
 Same as #3 above
 Same as #4 above
 Same as #5 above
 Same as #6 above
 Same as #7 above
 Wolrad, Prince of Schaumburg-Lippe (1887–1962) m. Princess Bathildis of Schaumburg-Lippe – pretender
 Philipp-Ernst, Prince of Schaumburg-Lippe (1928–2003) m. Eva-Benita von Tiele-Winckler
 Alexander, Prince of Schaumburg-Lippe (1958–) m. Princess Marie Luise of Sayn-Wittgenstein-Berleburg
 Reference:

The current pretender descends from Friso in other ways:

 Same as #1 above
 Same as #2 above
 Same as #3 above
 Princess Henriette of Nassau-Weilburg (1780–1857) m. Duke Louis of Württemberg
 Duchess Amelia of Württemberg (1799–1848) m. Joseph, Duke of Saxe-Altenburg
 Princess Alexandra of Saxe-Altenburg (1830–1911) m. Grand Duke Konstantin Nikolayevich of Russia
 Grand Duchess Vera Konstantinovna of Russia (1854–1912) m. Duke Eugen of Württemberg
 Duchess Elsa of Württemberg (1876–1936) m. Prince Albert of Schaumburg-Lippe
 Princess Bathildis of Schaumburg-Lippe (1903–1983) m. Wolrad, Prince of Schaumburg-Lippe
 Same as #9 above
 Same as #10 above

Schleswig-Holstein

The current pretender, Christoph, Prince of Schleswig-Holstein, descends  from Friso twice through his son's daughter:

 John William Friso, Prince of Orange (1687–1711) m. Landgravine Marie Louise of Hesse-Kassel
 William IV, Prince of Orange (1711–1751) m. Anne, Princess Royal
 Princess Carolina of Orange-Nassau (1743–1787) m. Charles Christian, Prince of Nassau-Weilburg
 Princess Henriette of Nassau-Weilburg (1780–1857) m. Duke Louis of Württemberg
 Duchess Amelia of Württemberg (1799–1848) m. Joseph, Duke of Saxe-Altenburg
 Princess Elisabeth of Saxe-Altenburg (1826–1896) m. Peter II, Grand Duke of Oldenburg
 Frederick Augustus II, Grand Duke of Oldenburg (1852–1931) m. Duchess Elisabeth Alexandrine of Mecklenburg-Schwerin
 Duchess Ingeborg Alix of Oldenburg (1901–1996) m. Prince Stephan of Schaumburg-Lippe
 Princess Marie Alix of Schaumburg-Lippe (1923–2021) m. Peter, Duke of Schleswig-Holstein
 Christoph, Prince of Schleswig-Holstein (1949–) m. Princess Elisabeth of Lippe-Weissenfeld - pretender

 Same as #1 above
 Same as #2 above
 Same as #3 above
 Frederick William, Prince of Nassau-Weilburg (1768–1816) m. Burgravine Louise Isabelle of Kirchberg
 Princess Ida of Anhalt-Bernburg-Schaumburg-Hoym (1804–1828) m. Augustus, Grand Duke of Oldenburg
 Peter II, Grand Duke of Oldenburg (1827–1900) m. Princess Elisabeth of Saxe-Altenburg
 Same as #7 above
 Same as #8 above
 Same as #9 above
 Same as #10 above

Waldeck and Pyrmont

Friedrich, Prince of Waldeck and Pyrmont, the last reigning Prince of Waldeck and Pyrmont, was descended from Friso's son's daughter in two ways:
 John William Friso, Prince of Orange (1687–1711) m. Landgravine Marie Louise of Hesse-Kassel
 William IV, Prince of Orange (1711–1751) m. Anne, Princess Royal
 Princess Carolina of Orange-Nassau (1743–1787) m. Charles Christian, Prince of Nassau-Weilburg
 Frederick William, Prince of Nassau-Weilburg (1768–1816) m. Burgravine Louise Isabelle of Kirchberg
 William, Duke of Nassau (1792–1839) m. Princess Pauline of Württemberg
 Princess Helena of Nassau (1831–1888) m. George Victor, Prince of Waldeck and Pyrmont
 Friedrich, Prince of Waldeck and Pyrmont (1865–1946) m. Princess Bathildis of Schaumburg-Lippe
 Josias, Hereditary Prince of Waldeck and Pyrmont (1896–1967) m. Duchess Altburg of Oldenburg – pretender
 Wittekind, Prince of Waldeck and Pyrmont (1936–) m. Countess Cecilie of Goëss-Saurau – pretender

 Same as #1 above
 Same as #2 above
 Same as #3 above
 Princess Amelia of Nassau-Weilburg (1776–1841) m. Victor II, Prince of Anhalt-Bernburg-Schaumburg-Hoym
 Princess Emma of Anhalt-Bernburg-Schaumburg-Hoym (1802–1858) m. George II, Prince of Waldeck and Pyrmont
 George Victor, Prince of Waldeck and Pyrmont (1831–1893) m. Princess Helena of Nassau
 Same as #7 above
 Same as #8 above
 Same as #9 above
 Reference:

The current pretender also descends from Friso through his mother in two ways:

 Same as #1 above
 Same as #2 above
 Same as #3 above
 Same as #4 above
 Princess Ida of Anhalt-Bernburg-Schaumburg-Hoym (1804–1828) m. Augustus, Grand Duke of Oldenburg
 Peter II, Grand Duke of Oldenburg (1827–1900) m. Princess Elisabeth of Saxe-Altenburg
 Frederick Augustus II, Grand Duke of Oldenburg (1852–1931) m. Duchess Elisabeth Alexandrine of Mecklenburg-Schwerin
 Duchess Altburg of Oldenburg (1903–2001) m. Josias, Hereditary Prince of Waldeck and Pyrmont
 Same as #9 above

 Same as #1 above
 Same as #2 above
 Same as #3 above
 Princess Henriette of Nassau-Weilburg (1780–1857) m. Duke Louis of Württemberg
 Duchess Amelia of Württemberg (1799–1848) m. Joseph, Duke of Saxe-Altenburg
 Princess Elisabeth of Saxe-Altenburg (1826–1896) m. Peter II, Grand Duke of Oldenburg
 Same as #7 above
 Same as #8 above
 Same as #9 above

Württemberg

William II of Württemberg, the last reigning King of Württemberg, was descended from Friso through his son's daughter:
 John William Friso, Prince of Orange (1687–1711) m. Landgravine Marie Louise of Hesse-Kassel
 William IV, Prince of Orange (1711–1751) m. Anne, Princess Royal
 Princess Carolina of Orange-Nassau (1743–1787) m. Charles Christian, Prince of Nassau-Weilburg
 Princess Henriette of Nassau-Weilburg (1780–1857) m. Duke Louis of Württemberg
 Pauline Therese of Württemberg (1800–1873) m. William I of Württemberg
 Princess Catherine of Württemberg (1821–1898) m. Prince Frederick of Württemberg
 William II of Württemberg (1848–1921) m. Princess Marie of Waldeck and Pyrmont
 Princess Pauline of Württemberg (1877–1965) m. Friedrich, Prince of Wied
 Prince Dietrich of Wied (1901–1976) m. Countess Antoinette Julia Grote 
 Prince Ulrich of Wied (1931–2010) m. Ilke Fischer
 Princess Marie of Wied (1973–) m. Duke Friedrich of Württemberg
 Wilhelm, Duke of Württemberg (1994–) – pretender

Upon William's death, the royal branch of the line became extinct, and the ducal branch succeeded as pretenders, beginning with Albrecht, Duke of Württemberg, whose lineage is shown here:
 Same as #1 above
 Same as #2 above
 Same as #3 above
 Frederick William, Prince of Nassau-Weilburg (1768–1816) m. Burgravine Louise Isabelle of Kirchberg
 Princess Henrietta of Nassau-Weilburg (1797–1829) m. Archduke Charles, Duke of Teschen
 Archduke Albrecht, Duke of Teschen (1817–1895) m. Princess Hildegard of Bavaria
 Archduchess Maria Theresa of Austria (1845–1927) m. Duke Philipp of Württemberg
 Albrecht, Duke of Württemberg (1865–1939) m. Archduchess Margarete Sophie of Austria – pretender
 Philipp Albrecht, Duke of Württemberg (1893–1975) m. Archduchess Rosa of Austria – pretender
 Carl, Duke of Württemberg (1936–2022) m. Princess Diane of Orléans – pretender
 Frederick of Wurttemberg (1961–2018) m. Princess Marie of Wied
 Same as #12 above

The current pretender, Wilhelm, is also descended from Friso in other ways:

 Same as #1 above
 Same as #2 above
 Same as #3 above
 Same as #4 above
 Same as #5 above
 Archduchess Maria Theresa of Austria (1816–1867) m. Ferdinand II of the Two Sicilies
 Princess Maria Annunciata of Bourbon-Two Sicilies (1843–1871) m. Archduke Karl Ludwig of Austria
 Archduchess Margarete Sophie of Austria (1870–1902) m. Albrecht, Duke of Württemberg
 Same as #9 above
 Same as #10 above
 Same as #11 above
 Same as #12 above

 Same as #1 above
 Same as #2 above
 Same as #3 above
 Same as #4 above
 Same as #5 above
 Same as #6 above
 Prince Alfonso, Count of Caserta (1841–1934) m. Princess Maria Antonietta of Bourbon-Two Sicilies
 Princess Maria Cristina of Bourbon-Two Sicilies (1877–1947) m. Archduke Peter Ferdinand of Austria
 Archduchess Rosa of Austria (1906–1983) m. Philipp Albrecht, Duke of Württemberg
 Same as #10 above
 Same as #11 above
 Same as #12 above

 Same as #1 above
 Same as #2 above
 Same as #3 above
 Same as #4 above
 William, Duke of Nassau (1792–1839) m. Princess Louise of Saxe-Hildburghausen
 Princess Marie of Nassau (1825–1902) m. Hermann, Prince of Wied
 William, Prince of Wied (1845–1907) m. Princess Marie of the Netherlands
 Friedrich, Prince of Wied (1872–1945) m. Princess Pauline of Württemberg
 Same as #9 in the first list
 Same as #10 in the first list
 Same as #11 in the first list
 Same as #12 above

 Same as #1 above
 Same as #2 above
 Same as #3 above
 Same as #4 above
 Same as #5 above but m. Princess Pauline of Württemberg
 Princess Helena of Nassau (1831–1888) m. George Victor, Prince of Waldeck and Pyrmont
 Princess Marie of Waldeck and Pyrmont (1857–1882) m. William II of Württemberg
 Same as #8 in the first list
 Same as #9 above
 Same as #10 above
 Same as #11 above
 Same as #12 above

 Same as #1 above
 Same as #2 above
 Same as #3 above
 Amelia of Nassau-Weilburg (1776–1841) m. Victor II, Prince of Anhalt-Bernburg-Schaumburg-Hoym
 Princess Emma of Anhalt-Bernburg-Schaumburg-Hoym (1801–1858) m. George II, Prince of Waldeck and Pyrmont
 George Victor, Prince of Waldeck and Pyrmont (1831–1893) m. Princess Helena of Nassau
 Same as #7 above
 Same as #8 above
 Same as #9 above
 Same as #10 above
 Same as #11 above
 Same as #12 above

 Same as #1 above
 Same as #2 above
 William V, Prince of Orange (1748–1806) m. Princess Wilhelmina of Prussia
 William I of the Netherlands (1772–1843) m. Princess Wilhelmine of Prussia
 Prince Frederick of the Netherlands (1797–1881) m. Princess Louise of Prussia
 Princess Marie of the Netherlands (1841–1910) m. William, Prince of Wied
 Same as #8 in the fifth list
 Same as #9 above
 Same as #10 above
 Same as #11 above
 Same as #12 above

 Same as #1 above
 Princess Amalia of Nassau-Dietz (1710–1777) m. Frederick, Hereditary Prince of Baden-Durlach
 Charles Frederick, Grand Duke of Baden (1728–1811) m. Louise Caroline Geyer von Geyersberg
 Charles Louis, Hereditary Prince of Baden (1755–1801) m. Princess Amalie of Hesse-Darmstadt
 Princess Caroline of Baden (1776–1841) m. Maximilian I Joseph of Bavaria
 Princess Sophie of Bavaria (1805–1872) m. Archduke Franz Karl of Austria
 Archduke Karl Ludwig of Austria (1833–1896) m. Infanta Maria Theresa of Portugal
 Same as #8 in the third list
 Same as #9 in the third list
 Same as #10 in the third list
 Same as #11 in the third list
 Same as #12 above
 Reference:

Greece

King Constantine II of Greece, the last Greek King, was descended from Friso through his son's daughter in two ways:
 John William Friso, Prince of Orange (1687–1711) m. Landgravine Marie Louise of Hesse-Kassel
 William IV, Prince of Orange (1711–1751) m. Anne, Princess Royal
 Princess Carolina of Orange-Nassau (1743–1787) m. Charles Christian, Prince of Nassau-Weilburg
 Princess Henriette of Nassau-Weilburg (1780–1857) m. Duke Louis of Württemberg
 Duchess Amelia of Württemberg (1799–1848) m. Joseph, Duke of Saxe-Altenburg
 Princess Alexandra of Saxe-Altenburg (1830–1911) m. Grand Duke Konstantin Nikolayevich of Russia
 Grand Duchess Olga Constantinovna of Russia (1851–1926) m. George I of Greece
 Constantine I of Greece (1868–1923) m. Princess Sophia of Prussia
 Paul of Greece (1901–1964) m. Princess Frederica of Hanover
 Constantine II of Greece (1940–2023) m. Princess Anne-Marie of Denmark
 Pavlos, Crown Prince of Greece (1967–) m. Marie-Chantal Miller

 Same as #1 above
 Same as #2 above
 Same as #3 above
 Same as #4 above
 Same as #5 above
 Princess Marie of Saxe-Altenburg (1818–1907) m. George V of Hanover
 Ernest Augustus, Crown Prince of Hanover (1845–1923) m. Princess Thyra of Denmark
 Ernest Augustus, Duke of Brunswick (1887–1953) m. Princess Victoria Louise of Prussia
 Princess Frederica of Hanover (1917–1981) m. Paul of Greece 
 Same as #10 above 
 Same as #11 above

The current pretender also descends from Friso through his mother:

 Same as #1 above
 Same as #2 above
 Same as #3 above
 Frederick William, Prince of Nassau-Weilburg (1768–1816) m. Burgravine Louise Isabelle of Kirchberg
 William, Duke of Nassau (1792–1839) m. Princess Pauline of Württemberg
 Princess Sophia of Nassau (1836–1913) m. Oscar II of Sweden
 Gustaf V of Sweden (1858–1950) m. Princess Victoria of Baden
 Gustaf VI Adolf of Sweden (1882–1973) m. Princess Margaret of Connaught 
 Princess Ingrid of Sweden (1910–2000) m. Frederick IX of Denmark
 Princess Anne-Marie of Denmark (1946–) m. Constantine II of Greece
 Same as #11 above

 Same as #1 above
 Same as #2 above
 William V, Prince of Orange (1748–1806) m. Princess Wilhelmina of Prussia
 William I of the Netherlands (1772–1843) m. Princess Wilhelmina of Prussia
 Prince Frederick of the Netherlands (1797–1881) m. Princess Louise of Prussia
 Princess Louise of the Netherlands (1828–1871) m. Charles XV of Sweden
 Princess Louise of Sweden (1851–1926) m. Frederick VIII of Denmark
 Christian X of Denmark (1870–1947) m. Duchess Alexandrine of Mecklenburg-Schwerin
 Frederick IX of Denmark (1899–1972) m. Princess Ingrid of Sweden
 Same as #10 above
 Same as #11 above

 Same as #1 above
 Princess Amalia of Nassau-Dietz (1710–1777) m. Frederick, Hereditary Prince of Baden-Durlach
 Charles Frederick, Grand Duke of Baden (1728–1811) m. Louise Caroline Geyer von Geyersberg
 Leopold, Grand Duke of Baden (1790–1852) m. Princess Sophie of Sweden
 Frederick I, Grand Duke of Baden (1826–1907) m. Princess Louise of Prussia
 Princess Victoria of Baden (1862–1930) m. Gustaf V of Sweden
 Same as #8 above in the third list
 Same as #9 above in the third list
 Same as #10 above
 Same as #11 above

 Same as #1 above
 Same as #2 above
 Same as #3 above
 Same as #4 above
 Princess Cecilie of Baden (1839–1891) m. Grand Duke Michael Nikolaevich of Russia
 Grand Duchess Anastasia Mikhailovna of Russia (1860–1922) m. Frederick Francis III, Grand Duke of Mecklenburg-Schwerin
 Duchess Alexandrine of Mecklenburg-Schwerin (1879–1952) m. Christian X of Denmark
 Same as #9 above in the fourth list
 Same as #10 above
 Same as #11 above

 Same as #1 above
 Same as #2 above
 Same as #3 above, but m. Landgravine Caroline Louise of Hesse-Darmstadt
 Charles Louis, Hereditary Prince of Baden (1755–1801) m. Princess Amalie of Hesse-Darmstadt
 Princess Frederica of Baden (1781–1826) m. Gustav IV Adolf of Sweden
 Princess Sophie of Sweden (1801–1865) m. Leopold, Grand Duke of Baden
 Same as #5 above
 Same as #6 above
 Same as #7 above
 Same as #8 above
 Same as #9 above
 Same as #10 above

 Same as #1 above
 Same as #2 above
 Same as #3 above
 Same as #4 above
 Same as #5 above
 Same as #6 above
 Same as #5 above in the fifth list
 Same as #6 above in the fifth list
 Same as #7 above in the fifth list
 Same as #8 above in the fifth list
 Same as #11 above
 Same as #12 above

 Reference:

Italy

Savoy

King Umberto II of Italy, the last Italian King, was descended from Friso through his daughter's son:
 John William Friso, Prince of Orange (1687–1711) m. Landgravine Marie Louise of Hesse-Kassel
 Princess Amalia of Nassau-Dietz (1710–1777) m. Frederick, Hereditary Prince of Baden-Durlach
 Charles Frederick, Grand Duke of Baden (1728–1811) m. Landgravine Caroline Louise of Hesse-Darmstadt
 Charles Louis, Hereditary Prince of Baden (1755–1801) m. Princess Amalie of Hesse-Darmstadt
 Caroline of Baden (1776–1841) m. Maximilian I Joseph of Bavaria
 Amalie Auguste of Bavaria (1801–1877) m. John of Saxony
 Princess Elisabeth of Saxony (1830–1912) m. Prince Ferdinand, Duke of Genoa
 Margherita of Savoy (1851–1926) m. Umberto I of Italy
 Victor Emmanuel III of Italy (1869–1947) m. Elena of Montenegro
 Umberto II of Italy (1904–1983) m. Marie José of Belgium
 Vittorio Emanuele, Prince of Naples (1937–) m. Marina Doria  – pretender
 Reference:

The current pretender also descends from Friso through his daughter's son in two more ways:
 Same as #1 above
 Same as #2 above
 Same as #3 above
 Same as #4 above
 Same as #5 above
 Princess Ludovika of Bavaria (1808–1892) m. Duke Maximilian Joseph in Bavaria
 Karl Theodor, Duke in Bavaria (1839–1909) m. Infanta Maria Josepha of Portugal
 Duchess Elisabeth in Bavaria (1876–1965) m. Albert I of Belgium
 Marie-José of Belgium  (1906–2001) m. Umberto II of Italy
 Same as #11 above

 Same as #1 above
 Same as #2 above
 Same as #3 above
 Same as #4 above
 Charles, Grand Duke of Baden (1786–1818) m. Stéphanie de Beauharnais
 Princess Josephine of Baden (1813–1900) m. Karl Anton, Prince of Hohenzollern
 Princess Marie of Hohenzollern-Sigmaringen (1845–1912) m. Prince Philippe, Count of Flanders
 Albert I of Belgium (1875–1934) m. Duchess Elisabeth in Bavaria
 Same as #9 above
 Same as #10 above

The Aosta pretender also descends from Friso through his son's daughter:
 Same as #1 above
 William IV, Prince of Orange (1711–1751) m. Anne, Princess Royal
 Princess Carolina of Orange-Nassau (1743–1787) m. Charles Christian, Prince of Nassau-Weilburg
 Princess Henriette of Nassau-Weilburg (1780–1857) m. Duke Louis of Württemberg
 Duchess Amelia of Württemberg (1799–1848) m. Joseph, Duke of Saxe-Altenburg
 Princess Alexandra of Saxe-Altenburg (1830–1911) m. Grand Duke Konstantin Nikolayevich of Russia
 Grand Duchess Olga Constantinovna of Russia (1851–1926) m. George I of Greece
 Constantine I of Greece (1868–1923) m. Princess Sophia of Prussia
 Princess Irene of Greece and Denmark (1904–1974) m. Prince Aimone, Duke of Aosta
 Prince Amedeo, Duke of Aosta (1943–2021) m. Princess Claude of Orléans
 Prince Aimone, Duke of Aosta (1967–) m. Princess Olga of Greece

His wife also descends from Friso through his son's daughter:
 Same as #1 above
 Same as #2 above
 Same as #3 above
 Same as #4 above
 Same as #5 above
 Same as #6 above
 Same as #7 above
 Prince Christopher of Greece and Denmark (1888–1940) m. Princess Françoise of Orléans
 Prince Michael of Greece and Denmark (1939–) m. Marina Karella
 Princess Olga of Greece (1971–) m. Prince Aimone, Duke of Aosta

Two Sicilies
At present, both lines that lay claim to the throne of the former Kingdom of the Two Sicilies, have produced claimants who are descended from Friso.

The claimant of the Castro branch, Prince Carlo, Duke of Castro, is descended from his son's daughter:
 John William Friso, Prince of Orange (1687–1711) m. Landgravine Marie Louise of Hesse-Kassel
 William IV, Prince of Orange (1711–1751) m. Anne, Princess Royal and Princess of Orange
 Princess Carolina of Orange-Nassau (1743–1787) m. Charles Christian, Prince of Nassau-Weilburg
 Frederick William, Prince of Nassau-Weilburg (1768–1816) m. Burgravine Louise Isabelle of Kirchberg
 Princess Henrietta of Nassau-Weilburg (1797–1829) m. Archduke Charles, Duke of Teschen
 Maria Theresa of Austria (1816–1867) m. Ferdinand II of the Two Sicilies
 Prince Alfonso, Count of Caserta (1841–1934) m. Princess Maria Antonietta of Bourbon-Two Sicilies - pretender
 Prince Ranieri, Duke of Castro (1883–1973) m. Countess Maria Carolina Zamoyska - pretender
 Prince Ferdinand, Duke of Castro (1926–2008) m. Chantal de Chevron-Villette - pretender
 Prince Carlo, Duke of Castro (1963–) m. Camilla Crociani– pretender

The claimant of the Calabria branch, Prince Pedro, Duke of Calabria, is descended from his son's daughter six ways:
 John William Friso, Prince of Orange (1687–1711) m. Landgravine Marie Louise of Hesse-Kassel
 William IV, Prince of Orange (1711–1751) m. Anne, Princess Royal and Princess of Orange
 Princess Carolina of Orange-Nassau (1743–1787) m. Charles Christian, Prince of Nassau-Weilburg
 Princess Henriette of Nassau-Weilburg (1780–1857) m. Duke Louis of Württemberg
 Duchess Maria Dorothea of Württemberg (1797–1855) m. Archduke Joseph, Palatine of Hungary
 Archduchess Elisabeth Franziska of Austria (1831–1903) m. Archduke Karl Ferdinand of Austria
 Maria Christina of Austria (1858–1929) m. Alfonso XII of Spain
 María de las Mercedes, Princess of Asturias (1880–1904) m. Prince Carlos of Bourbon-Two Sicilies
 Infante Alfonso, Duke of Calabria (1901–1964) m. Infanta Alicia, Duchess of Calabria - pretender
 Infante Carlos, Duke of Calabria (1938–2015) m. Princess Anne of Orléans - pretender
 Prince Pedro, Duke of Calabria (1968–) m. Sofía Landaluce y Melgarejo – pretender

 Same as #1 above
 Same as #2 above
 Same as #3 above
 Same as #4 above
 Same as #5 above
 Same as #6 above
 Archduke Friedrich, Duke of Teschen (1856–1936) m. Princess Isabella of Croÿ
 Archduchess Maria Anna of Austria (1882–1940) m. Elias, Duke of Parma
 Princess Alicia of Bourbon-Parma (1917–2017) m. Infante Alfonso, Duke of Calabria
 Same as #10 above
 Same as #11 above

 Same as #1 above
 Same as #2 above
 Same as #3 above
 Frederick William, Prince of Nassau-Weilburg (1768–1816) m. Burgravine Louise Isabella of Kirchberg
 Princess Henrietta of Nassau-Weilburg (1797–1829) m. Archduke Charles, Duke of Teschen
 Archduke Karl Ferdinand of Austria (1818–1874) m. Archduchess Elisabeth Franziska of Austria
 Same as #7 above
 Same as #8 above
 Same as #9 above
 Same as #10 above
 Same as #11 above

 Same as #1 above
 Same as #2 above
 Same as #3 above
 Same as #4 in the first list
 Same as #5 in the first list
 Same as #6 in the first list
 Same as #7 in the first list
 Same as #8 in the first list
 Same as #9 in the first list
 Same as #10 above
 Same as #11 above

 Same as #1 above
 Same as #2 above
 Same as #3 above
 Same as #4 in the third list
 Same as #5 in the third list
 Maria Theresa of Austria (1816–1867) m. Ferdinand II of the Two Sicilies
 Prince Alfonso, Count of Caserta (1841–1934) m. Princess Maria Antonietta of Bourbon-Two Sicilies
 Prince Carlos of Bourbon-Two Sicilies (1870–1949) m. María de las Mercedes, Princess of Asturias
 Same as #9 above
 Same as #10 above
 Same as #11 above

 Same as #1 above
 Same as #2 above
 Same as #3 above
 Same as #4 above
 Same as #5 above
 Same as #6 above
 Princess Maria Pia of Bourbon-Two Sicilies (1849–1882) m. Robert I, Duke of Parma
 Elias, Duke of Parma (1880–1959) m. Archduchess Maria Anna of Austria
 Same as #9 in the third list
 Same as #10 above
 Same as #11 above

Modena
Prince Lorenz of Belgium, the pretender to the throne of Modena, descends from both Friso's children:

 John William Friso, Prince of Orange (1687–1711) m. Landgravine Marie Louise of Hesse-Kassel
 Princess Amalia of Nassau-Dietz (1710–1777) m. Frederick, Hereditary Prince of Baden-Durlach
 Charles Frederick, Grand Duke of Baden (1728–1811) m. Landgravine Caroline Louise of Hesse-Darmstadt
 Charles Louis, Hereditary Prince of Baden (1755–1801) m. Princess Amalie of Hesse-Darmstadt
 Princess Caroline of Baden (1776–1841) m. Maximilian I Joseph of Bavaria
 Princess Sophie of Bavaria (1805–1872) m. Archduke Franz Karl of Austria
 Archduke Karl Ludwig of Austria (1833–1896) m. Princess Maria Annunciata of Bourbon-Two Sicilies
 Archduke Otto of Austria (1865–1906) m. Princess Maria Josepha of Saxony
 Charles I of Austria (1887–1922) m. Princess Zita of Bourbon-Parma - pretender
 Robert, Archduke of Austria-Este (1915–1996) m. Princess Margherita of Savoy-Aosta - pretender
 Archduke Lorenz of Austria-Este (1961–) m. Princess Astrid of Belgium – pretender

 Same as #1 above
 Same as #2 above
 Same as #3 above
 Same as #4 above
 Same as #5 above
 Amalie Auguste of Bavaria (1801–1877) m. John of Saxony
 George, King of Saxony (1832–1904) m. Infanta Maria Ana of Portugal
 Princess Maria Josepha of Saxony (1867–1944) m. Archduke Otto of Austria
 Same as #9 above
 Same as #10 above
 Same as #11 above

 Same as #1 above
 William IV, Prince of Orange (1711–1751) m. Anne, Princess Royal
 Princess Carolina of Orange-Nassau (1743–1787) m. Charles Christian, Prince of Nassau-Weilburg
 Frederick William, Prince of Nassau-Weilburg (1768–1816) m. Burgravine Louise Isabelle of Kirchberg
 Princess Henrietta of Nassau-Weilburg (1797–1829) m. Archduke Charles, Duke of Teschen
 Archduchess Maria Theresa of Austria (1816–1867) m. Ferdinand II of the Two Sicilies
 Princess Maria Annunciata of Bourbon-Two Sicilies (1843–1871) m. Archduke Karl Ludwig of Austria
 Same as #8 in the first list
 Same as #9 above
 Same as #10 above
 Same as #11 above

Princess Astrid of Belgium, the pretender's wife, is the sister of King Philippe of Belgium. See their lineage here.

Parma
The Parmese pretender, Prince Carlos, Duke of Parma, is descended from Friso through his son's son in one way and his son's daughter in two:

 John William Friso, Prince of Orange (1687–1711) m. Landgravine Marie Louise of Hesse-Kassel
 William IV, Prince of Orange (1711–1751) m. Anne, Princess Royal and Princess of Orange
 William V, Prince of Orange (1748–1806) m. Wilhelmina of Prussia, Princess of Orange
 William I of the Netherlands (1772–1843) m. Wilhelmine of Prussia, Queen of the Netherlands
 William II of the Netherlands (1792–1849) m. Anna Pavlovna of Russia
 William III of the Netherlands (1817–1890) m. Emma of Waldeck and Pyrmont
 Wilhelmina of the Netherlands (1880–1962) m. Duke Henry of Mecklenburg-Schwerin
 Juliana of the Netherlands (1909–2004) m. Prince Bernhard of Lippe-Biesterfeld
 Princess Irene of the Netherlands (1939–) m. Carlos Hugo, Duke of Parma
 Prince Carlos, Duke of Parma (1970–) m. Annemarie Gualthérie van Weezel

 Same as #1 above
 Same as #2 above
 Princess Carolina of Orange-Nassau (1743–1787) m. Charles Christian, Prince of Nassau-Weilburg
 Frederick William, Prince of Nassau-Weilburg (1768–1816) m. Burgravine Louise Isabelle of Kirchberg
 William, Duke of Nassau (1792–1839) m. Princess Pauline of Württemberg
 Princess Helena of Nassau (1831–1888) m. George Victor, Prince of Waldeck and Pyrmont
 Emma of Waldeck and Pyrmont (1858–1934) m. William III of the Netherlands
 Same as #7 above
 Same as #8 above
 Same as #9 above
 Same as #10 above

 Same as #1 above
 Same as #2 above
 Same as #3 above
 Amelia of Nassau-Weilburg (1776–1841) m. Victor II, Prince of Anhalt-Bernburg-Schaumburg-Hoym
 Princess Emma of Anhalt-Bernburg-Schaumburg-Hoym (1802–1858) m. George II, Prince of Waldeck and Pyrmont
 George Victor, Prince of Waldeck and Pyrmont (1831–1893) m. Princess Helena of Nassau
 Same as #7 above
 Same as #8 above
 Same as #9 above
 Same as #10 above
 Same as #11 above

Tuscany
The Tuscan pretender descends from Friso twice through his son's daughter:

 John William Friso, Prince of Orange (1687–1711) m. Landgravine Marie Louise of Hesse-Kassel
 William IV, Prince of Orange (1711–1751) m. Anne, Princess Royal and Princess of Orange
 Princess Carolina of Orange-Nassau (1743–1787) m. Charles Christian, Prince of Nassau-Weilburg
 Frederick William, Prince of Nassau-Weilburg (1768–1816) m. Burgravine Louise Isabella of Kirchberg
 Princess Henrietta of Nassau-Weilburg (1797–1829) m. Archduke Charles, Duke of Teschen
 Maria Theresa of Austria (1816–1867) m. Ferdinand II of the Two Sicilies
 Prince Alfonso, Count of Caserta (1841–1934) m. Princess Maria Antonietta of Bourbon-Two Sicilies
 Princess Maria Cristina of Bourbon-Two Sicilies (1877–1947) m. Archduke Peter Ferdinand of Austria
 Archduke Gottfried of Austria (1902–1984) m. Princess Dorothea of Bavaria
 Archduke Leopold of Austria, Prince of Tuscany (1942–2021) m. Laetitia d'Arenberg
 Archduke Sigismund of Austria, Prince of Tuscany (1966–)

 Same as #1 above
 Same as #2 above
 Same as #3 above
 Princess Henriette of Nassau-Weilburg (1780–1857) m. Duke Louis of Württemberg
 Duchess Maria Dorothea of Württemberg (1797–1855) m. Archduke Joseph of Austria
 Archduchess Elisabeth Franziska of Austria (1831–1903) m. Archduke Ferdinand Karl Viktor of Austria-Este
 Maria Theresa of Austria-Este (1849–1919) m. Ludwig III of Bavaria
 Prince Franz of Bavaria (1875–1957) m. Princess Isabella Antonie of Croÿ 
 Princess Dorothea of Bavaria (1920–2015) m. Archduke Gottfried of Austria
 Same as #10 above
 Same as #11 above

Liechtenstein

Hans-Adam II, Prince of Liechtenstein is descended from Friso through his daughter's son:
 John William Friso, Prince of Orange (1687–1711) m. Landgravine Marie Louise of Hesse-Kassel
 Princess Amalia of Nassau-Dietz (1710–1777) m. Frederick, Hereditary Prince of Baden-Durlach
 Charles Frederick, Grand Duke of Baden (1728–1811) m. Landgravine Caroline Louise of Hesse-Darmstadt
 Charles Louis, Hereditary Prince of Baden (1755–1801) m. Princess Amalie of Hesse-Darmstadt
 Caroline of Baden (1776–1841) m. Maximilian I Joseph of Bavaria
 Princess Sophie of Bavaria (1805–1872) m. Archduke Franz Karl of Austria
 Archduke Karl Ludwig of Austria (1833–1896) m. Infanta Maria Theresa of Portugal
 Archduchess Elisabeth Amalie of Austria (1878–1960) m. Prince Aloys of Liechtenstein
 Franz Joseph II, Prince of Liechtenstein (1906–1989) m. Countess Georgina von Wilczek
 Hans-Adam II, Prince of Liechtenstein (1945–) m. Countess Marie Kinsky of Wchinitz and Tettau
 References:

Sophie, Hereditary Princess of Liechtenstein, the wife of Hans-Adam II's son and heir Alois, Hereditary Prince of Liechtenstein, also descends from Friso twice through his daughter's son and once through his son's daughter:

 Same as #1 above
 Same as #2 above
 Same as #3 above
 Same as #4 above
 Same as #5 above
 Princess Ludovika of Bavaria (1808–1892) m. Duke Maximilian Joseph in Bavaria
 Karl Theodor, Duke in Bavaria (1839–1909) m. Infanta Maria Josepha of Portugal
 Duchess Marie Gabrielle in Bavaria (1839–1909) m. Rupprecht, Crown Prince of Bavaria
 Albrecht, Duke of Bavaria (1905–1996) m. Countess Maria Draskovich of Trakostjan
 Prince Max, Duke in Bavaria (1937–) m. Countess Elisabeth Douglas
 Sophie, Hereditary Princess of Liechtenstein (1967–) m. Alois, Hereditary Prince of Liechtenstein

 Same as #1 above
 Same as #2 above
 Same as #3 above
 Louis I, Grand Duke of Baden (1763–1830) w. Katharina Werner
 Countess Louise von Langenstein und Gondelsheim (1825–1900) m. Count Carl Israel Douglas
 Ludvig Douglas (1849–1916) m. Countess Anna Louise Dorotea
 Archibald Douglas (1883–1960) m. Astri Henschen
 Carl Douglas (1908–1961) m. Ottora Maria Haas-Heye
 Countess Elisabeth Douglas (1940–) m. Prince Max, Duke in Bavaria
 Same as #11 above

 Same as #1 above
 William IV, Prince of Orange (1711–1751) m. Anne, Princess Royal
 Princess Carolina of Orange-Nassau (1743–1787) m. Charles Christian, Prince of Nassau-Weilburg
 Princess Henriette of Nassau-Weilburg (1780–1857) m. Duke Louis of Württemberg
 Duchess Maria Dorothea of Württemberg (1797–1855) m. Archduke Joseph, Palatine of Hungary
 Archduchess Elisabeth Franziska of Austria (1831–1903) m. Archduke Ferdinand Karl Viktor of Austria-Este
 Archduchess Maria Theresa of Austria-Este (1849–1919) m. Ludwig III of Bavaria
 Rupprecht, Crown Prince of Bavaria (1869–1955) m. Duchess Marie Gabrielle in Bavaria 
 Same as #9 in first list
 Same as #10 in first list
 Same as #10 above

Lithuania

The would-be heir to the short lived throne of Lithuania descends from Friso in multiple ways:

 John William Friso, Prince of Orange (1687–1711) m. Landgravine Marie Louise of Hesse-Kassel
 Princess Amalia of Nassau-Dietz (1710–1777) m. Frederick, Hereditary Prince of Baden-Durlach
 Charles Frederick, Grand Duke of Baden (1728–1811) m. Landgravine Caroline Louise of Hesse-Darmstadt
 Charles Louis, Hereditary Prince of Baden (1755–1801) m. Princess Amalie of Hesse-Darmstadt
 Caroline of Baden (1776–1841) m. Maximilian I Joseph of Bavaria
 Amalie Auguste of Bavaria (1801–1877) m. John of Saxony
 Princess Sophie of Saxony (1845–1867) m. Karl Theodor, Duke in Bavaria
 Duchess Amalie in Bavaria (1865–1912) m. Mindaugas II of Lithuania
 Prince Eberhard of Urach (1907–1969) m. Princess Iniga of Thurn and Taxis
 Prince Inigo, Duke of Urach (1962–) m. Danielle von und zu Bodman - pretender

 Same as #1 above
 Same as #2 above
 Same as #3 above
 Same as #4 above
 Same as #5 above
 Princess Ludovika of Bavaria (1808–1892) m. Duke Maximilian Joseph in Bavaria
 Karl Theodor, Duke in Bavaria (1839–1909) m. Princess Sophie of Saxony
 Same as #8 above
 Same as #9 above
 Same as #10 above

 Same as #1 above
 Same as #2 above
 Same as #3 above
 Same as #4 above
 Same as #5 above
 Same as #6 above
 Duchess Helene in Bavaria (1834–1890) m. Maximilian Anton, Hereditary Prince of Thurn and Taxis
 Albert, 8th Prince of Thurn and Taxis (1867–1952) m. Archduchess Margarethe Klementine of Austria
 Prince Ludwig Philipp of Thurn and Taxis (1901–1933) m. Princess Elisabeth of Luxembourg
 Princess Iniga of Thurn and Taxis (1925–2008) m. Prince Eberhard of Urach
 Same as #10 above

 Same as #1 above
 William IV, Prince of Orange (1711–1751) m. Anne, Princess Royal
 Princess Carolina of Orange-Nassau (1743–1787) m. Charles Christian, Prince of Nassau-Weilburg
 Princess Henriette of Nassau-Weilburg (1780–1857) m. Duke Louis of Württemberg
 Duchess Maria Dorothea of Württemberg (1797–1855) m. Archduke Joseph, Palatine of Hungary
 Archduke Joseph Karl of Austria (1833–1905) m. Princess Clotilde of Saxe-Coburg and Gotha
 Archduchess Margarethe Klementine of Austria (1870–1955) m. Albert, 8th Prince of Thurn and Taxis
 Same as #9 above
 Same as #10 above
 Same as #11 above

 Same as #1 above
 Same as #2 above
 Same as #3 above
 Frederick William, Prince of Nassau-Weilburg (1768–1816) m. Burgravine Louise Isabella of Kirchberg
 William, Duke of Nassau (1792–1839) m. Princess Louise of Saxe-Hildburghausen
 Adolphe, Grand Duke of Luxembourg (1817–1905) m. Princess Adelheid-Marie of Anhalt-Dessau
 William IV, Grand Duke of Luxembourg (1852–1912) m. Infanta Marie Anne of Portugal
 Princess Elisabeth of Luxembourg (1901–1950) m. Prince Ludwig Philipp of Thurn and Taxis
 Same as #9 above
 Same as #10 above

Luxembourg

Henri, Grand Duke of Luxembourg is descended from Friso through his son's son in one way and his son's daughter in two:
 John William Friso, Prince of Orange (1687–1711) m. Landgravine Marie Louise of Hesse-Kassel
 William IV, Prince of Orange (1711–1751) m. Anne, Princess Royal and Princess of Orange
 William V, Prince of Orange (1748–1806) m. Wilhelmina of Prussia, Princess of Orange
 William I of the Netherlands (1772–1843) m. Wilhelmine of Prussia, Queen of the Netherlands
 Prince Frederick of the Netherlands (1797–1881) m. Princess Louise of Prussia
 Louise of the Netherlands (1828–1871) m. Charles XV of Sweden
 Louise of Sweden (1851–1926) m. Frederick VIII of Denmark
 Princess Ingeborg of Denmark (1878–1958) m. Prince Carl, Duke of Västergötland
 Astrid of Sweden (1905–1935) m. Leopold III of Belgium
 Princess Joséphine Charlotte of Belgium (1927–2005) m. Jean, Grand Duke of Luxembourg
 Henri, Grand Duke of Luxembourg (1955–) m. María Teresa Mestre y Batista

 Same as #1 above
 Same as #2 above
 Princess Carolina of Orange-Nassau (1743–1787) m. Charles Christian, Prince of Nassau-Weilburg
 Frederick William, Prince of Nassau-Weilburg (1768–1816) m. Burgravine Louise Isabelle of Kirchberg
 William, Duke of Nassau (1792–1839) m. Princess Louise of Saxe-Hildburghausen
 Adolphe, Grand Duke of Luxembourg (1817–1905) m. Princess Adelheid-Marie of Anhalt-Dessau
 William IV, Grand Duke of Luxembourg (1852–1912) m. Infanta Marie Anne of Portugal
 Charlotte, Grand Duchess of Luxembourg (1896–1985) m. Prince Felix of Bourbon-Parma
 Jean, Grand Duke of Luxembourg (1921–2019) m. Princess Joséphine Charlotte of Belgium
 Same as #11 above

 Same as #1 above
 Same as #2 above
 Same as #3 above
 Same as #4 above
 Same as #5 above
 Sophia of Nassau (1836–1913) m. Oscar II of Sweden
 Prince Carl, Duke of Västergötland (1861–1951) m. Princess Ingeborg of Denmark
 Same as #9 in first list
 Same as #10 in first list
 Same as #11 in first list
 Reference:

He also descends through his daughter, Princess Amalia of Nassau-Dietz in two ways: 
 Same as #1 above
 Princess Amalia of Nassau-Dietz (1710–1777) m. Frederick, Hereditary Prince of Baden-Durlach
 Charles Frederick, Grand Duke of Baden (1728–1811) m. Landgravine Caroline Louise of Hesse-Darmstadt
 Charles Louis, Hereditary Prince of Baden (1755–1801) m. Princess Amalie of Hesse-Darmstadt
 Charles, Grand Duke of Baden (1786–1818) m. Stéphanie de Beauharnais
 Princess Josephine of Baden (1813–1900) m. Karl Anton, Prince of Hohenzollern
 Princess Marie of Hohenzollern-Sigmaringen (1845–1912) m. Prince Philippe, Count of Flanders
 Albert I of Belgium (1875–1934) m. Duchess Elisabeth in Bavaria
 Leopold III of Belgium (1901–1983) m. Princess Astrid of Sweden
 Same as #9 in the third list
 Same as #10 in the third list

 Same as #1 above
 Same as #2 above
 Same as #3 above
 Same as #4 above
 Caroline of Baden (1776–1841) m. Maximilian I Joseph of Bavaria
 Princess Ludovika of Bavaria (1808–1892) m. Duke Maximilian Joseph in Bavaria
 Karl Theodor, Duke in Bavaria (1839–1909) m. Infanta Maria Josepha of Portugal
 Duchess Elisabeth in Bavaria (1876–1965) m. Albert I of Belgium
 Same as #9 above
 Same as #10 above
 Same as #11 above

Mexico

Maximilian I of Mexico, the only Emperor of the Second Mexican Empire, was descended from Friso through his daughter's son:

 John William Friso, Prince of Orange (1687–1711) m. Landgravine Marie Louise of Hesse-Kassel
 Princess Amalia of Nassau-Dietz (1710–1777) m. Frederick, Hereditary Prince of Baden-Durlach
 Charles Frederick, Grand Duke of Baden (1728–1811) m. Landgravine Caroline Louise of Hesse-Darmstadt
 Charles Louis, Hereditary Prince of Baden (1755–1801) m. Princess Amalie of Hesse-Darmstadt
 Caroline of Baden (1776–1841) m. Maximilian I Joseph of Bavaria
 Princess Sophie of Bavaria (1805–1872) m. Archduke Franz Karl of Austria
 Maximilian I of Mexico (1832–1867) m. Charlotte of Belgium

One of the potential claimants descends through Maximilian's brother:
 Same as #1 above
 Same as #2 above
 Same as #3 above
 Same as #4 above
 Same as #5 above
 Same as #5 above
 Archduke Karl Ludwig of Austria (1833–1896) m. Princess Maria Annunciata of Bourbon-Two Sicilies
 Archduke Otto of Austria (1865–1906) m. Princess Maria Josepha of Saxony
 Charles I of Austria (1887–1922) m. Princess Zita of Bourbon-Parma
 Archduke Felix of Austria (1916–2011) m. Princess and Duchess Anna-Eugénie of Arenberg 
 Carlos Felipe de Habsburgo (1954–) m. Annie-Claire Lacrambe – pretender

 Same as #1 above
 Same as #2 above
 Same as #3 above
 Same as #4 above
 Same as #5 above
 Amalie Auguste of Bavaria (1801–1877) m. John of Saxony
 George, King of Saxony (1832–1904) m. Infanta Maria Ana of Portugal
 Princess Maria Josepha of Saxony (1867–1944) m. Archduke Otto of Austria
 Same as #9 above
 Same as #10 above
 Same as #11 above

Monaco

Albert II, Prince of Monaco is descended from Friso through his daughter's son:
 John William Friso, Prince of Orange (1687–1711) m. Landgravine Marie Louise of Hesse-Kassel
 Princess Amalia of Nassau-Dietz (1710–1777) m. Frederick, Hereditary Prince of Baden-Durlach
 Charles Frederick, Grand Duke of Baden (1728–1811) m. Landgravine Caroline Louise of Hesse-Darmstadt
 Charles Louis, Hereditary Prince of Baden (1755–1801) m. Princess Amalie of Hesse-Darmstadt
 Charles, Grand Duke of Baden (1786–1818) m. Stéphanie de Beauharnais
 Princess Marie Amelie of Baden (1817–1888) m. William Hamilton, 11th Duke of Hamilton
 Mary Victoria Douglas-Hamilton (1850–1922) m. Albert I, Prince of Monaco
 Louis II, Prince of Monaco (1870–1949) w. Marie Juliette Louvet
 Princess Charlotte, Duchess of Valentinois (1898–1977) m. Count Pierre de Polignac
 Rainier III, Prince of Monaco (1923–2005) m. Grace Kelly
 Albert II, Prince of Monaco (1958–) m. Charlene Wittstock
 Jacques, Hereditary Prince of Monaco (2014–)

Netherlands

King Willem-Alexander of the Netherlands is descended from Friso through his son's son in one way and his son's daughter in two:
 John William Friso, Prince of Orange (1687–1711) m. Landgravine Marie Louise of Hesse-Kassel
 William IV, Prince of Orange (1711–1751) m. Anne, Princess Royal and Princess of Orange
 William V, Prince of Orange (1748–1806) m. Wilhelmina of Prussia, Princess of Orange
 William I of the Netherlands (1772–1843) m. Wilhelmine of Prussia, Queen of the Netherlands
 William II of the Netherlands (1792–1849) m. Anna Pavlovna of Russia
 William III of the Netherlands (1817–1890) m. Emma of Waldeck and Pyrmont
 Wilhelmina of the Netherlands (1880–1962) m. Duke Henry of Mecklenburg-Schwerin
 Juliana of the Netherlands (1909–2004) m. Prince Bernhard of Lippe-Biesterfeld
 Beatrix of the Netherlands (1938–) m. Klaus von Amsberg
 Willem-Alexander of the Netherlands (1967–) m. Máxima Zorreguieta Cerruti

 Same as #1 above
 Same as #2 above
 Princess Carolina of Orange-Nassau (1743–1787) m. Charles Christian, Prince of Nassau-Weilburg
 Frederick William, Prince of Nassau-Weilburg (1768–1816) m. Burgravine Louise Isabelle of Kirchberg
 William, Duke of Nassau (1792–1839) m. Princess Pauline of Württemberg
 Princess Helena of Nassau (1831–1888) m. George Victor, Prince of Waldeck and Pyrmont
 Emma of Waldeck and Pyrmont (1858–1934) m. William III of the Netherlands
 Same as #7 above
 Same as #8 above
 Same as #9 above
 Same as #10 above

 Same as #1 above
 Same as #2 above
 Same as #3 above
 Amelia of Nassau-Weilburg (1776–1841) m. Victor II, Prince of Anhalt-Bernburg-Schaumburg-Hoym
 Princess Emma of Anhalt-Bernburg-Schaumburg-Hoym (1802–1858) m. George II, Prince of Waldeck and Pyrmont
 George Victor, Prince of Waldeck and Pyrmont (1831–1893) m. Princess Helena of Nassau
 Same as #7 above
 Same as #8 above
 Same as #9 above
 Same as #10 above
 Same as #11 above

Norway

King Harald V of Norway is descended from Friso through his son's son in two ways and his son's daughter in one:
 John William Friso, Prince of Orange (1687–1711) m. Landgravine Marie Louise of Hesse-Kassel
 William IV, Prince of Orange (1711–1751) m. Anne, Princess Royal and Princess of Orange
 William V, Prince of Orange (1748–1806) m. Wilhelmina of Prussia, Princess of Orange
 William I of the Netherlands (1772–1843) m. Wilhelmine of Prussia, Queen of the Netherlands
 Prince Frederick of the Netherlands (1797–1881) m. Princess Louise of Prussia
 Louise of the Netherlands (1828–1871) m. Charles XV of Sweden
 Louise of Sweden (1851–1926) m. Frederick VIII of Denmark
 Haakon VII of Norway (1872–1957) m. Maud of Wales
 Olav V of Norway (1903–1991) m. Princess Märtha of Sweden
 Harald V of Norway (1937–) m. Sonja Haraldsen

 Same as #1 above
 Same as #2 above
 Same as #3 above
 Same as #4 above
 Same as #5 above
 Same as #6 above
 Same as #7 above
 Princess Ingeborg of Denmark (1878–1958) m. Prince Carl, Duke of Västergötland
 Princess Märtha of Sweden (1901–1954) m. Olav V of Norway
 Same as #10 above

 Same as #1 above
 Same as #2 above
 Princess Carolina of Orange-Nassau (1743–1787) m. Charles Christian, Prince of Nassau-Weilburg
 Frederick William, Prince of Nassau-Weilburg (1768–1816) m. Burgravine Louise Isabelle of Kirchberg
 William, Duke of Nassau (1792–1839) m. Princess Pauline of Württemberg
 Sophia of Nassau (1836–1913) m. Oscar II of Sweden
 Prince Carl, Duke of Västergötland (1861–1951) m. Princess Ingeborg of Denmark
 Same as #9 above
 Same as #10 above
 Reference:

Portugal 

Although Manuel II of Portugal, the last King of Portugal, was not descended from Friso, his Queen consort Augusta Victoria of Hohenzollern, was. She descended from his son's daughter and his daughter's son twice:
 John William Friso, Prince of Orange (1687–1711) m. Landgravine Marie Louise of Hesse-Kassel
 William IV, Prince of Orange (1711–1751) m. Anne, Princess Royal and Princess of Orange
 Princess Carolina of Orange-Nassau (1743–1787) m. Charles Christian, Prince of Nassau-Weilburg
 Frederick William, Prince of Nassau-Weilburg (1768–1816) m. Burgravine Louise Isabelle of Kirchberg
 Princess Henrietta of Nassau-Weilburg (1797–1829) m. Archduke Charles, Duke of Teschen
 Maria Theresa of Austria (1816–1867) m. Ferdinand II of the Two Sicilies
 Prince Louis, Count of Trani (1838-1886) m. Duchess Mathilde Ludovika in Bavaria
 Princess Maria Teresa of Bourbon-Two Sicilies (1867-1909) m. William, Prince of Hohenzollern
 Princess Augusta Victoria of Hohenzollern (1890-1966) m. Manuel II of Portugal

 Same as #1 above
 Princess Amalia of Nassau-Dietz (1710–1777) m. Frederick, Hereditary Prince of Baden-Durlach
 Charles Frederick, Grand Duke of Baden (1728–1811) m. Princess Caroline Louise of Hesse-Darmstadt
 Charles Louis, Hereditary Prince of Baden (1755–1801) m. Princess Amalie of Hesse-Darmstadt
 Caroline of Baden (1776–1841) m. Maximilian I Joseph of Bavaria
 Princess Ludovika of Bavaria (1808–1892) m. Duke Maximilian Joseph in Bavaria
 Duchess Mathilde Ludovika in Bavaria (1843–1925) m. Prince Louis, Count of Trani
 Same as #8 above
 Same as #9 above

 Same as #1 above
 Same as #2 above
 Same as #3 above
 Same as #4 above
 Charles, Grand Duke of Baden (1786–1818) m. Stéphanie de Beauharnais
 Princess Josephine of Baden (1813–1900) m. Karl Anton, Prince of Hohenzollern
 Leopold, Prince of Hohenzollern (1835–1905) m. Infanta Antónia of Portugal
 William, Prince of Hohenzollern (1864–1927) m. Princess Maria Teresa of Bourbon-Two Sicilies
 Same as #9 above

The current pretender to the Portuguese throne, Duarte Pio, Duke of Braganza, is not descended from Friso.

Romania

King Michael I of Romania, the last King of Romania, was descended from Friso through his son's daughter in one way and his daughter's son in two:
 John William Friso, Prince of Orange (1687–1711) m. Landgravine Marie Louise of Hesse-Kassel
 Princess Amalia of Nassau-Dietz (1710–1777) m. Frederick, Hereditary Prince of Baden-Durlach
 Charles Frederick, Grand Duke of Baden (1728–1811) m. Landgravine Caroline Louise of Hesse-Darmstadt
 Charles Louis, Hereditary Prince of Baden (1755–1801) m. Princess Amalie of Hesse-Darmstadt
 Princess Wilhelmine of Baden (1788–1836) m. Louis II, Grand Duke of Hesse
 Marie of Hesse and by Rhine (1824–1880) m. Alexander II of Russia
 Grand Duchess Maria Alexandrovna of Russia (1853–1920) m. Alfred, Duke of Saxe-Coburg and Gotha
 Marie of Romania (1875–1938) m. Ferdinand I of Romania
 Carol II of Romania (1893–1953) m. Helen of Greece and Denmark
 Michael I of Romania (1921–2017) m. Anne of Bourbon-Parma
 Princess Margareta of Romania (1949–) m. Prince Radu of Romania

 Same as #1 above
 Same as #2 above
 Same as #3 above
 Same as #4 above
 Charles, Grand Duke of Baden (1786–1818) m. Stéphanie de Beauharnais
 Princess Josephine of Baden (1813–1900) m. Karl Anton, Prince of Hohenzollern
 Leopold, Prince of Hohenzollern (1835–1905) m. Infanta Antónia of Portugal
 Ferdinand I of Romania (1865–1927) m. Marie of Edinburgh
 Same as #9 above
 Same as #10 above
 Same as #11 above

 Same as #1 above
 William IV, Prince of Orange (1711–1751) m. Anne, Princess Royal and Princess of Orange
 Princess Carolina of Orange-Nassau (1743–1787) m. Charles Christian, Prince of Nassau-Weilburg
 Princess Henriette of Nassau-Weilburg (1780–1857) m. Duke Louis of Württemberg
 Duchess Amelia of Württemberg (1799–1848) m. Joseph, Duke of Saxe-Altenburg
 Princess Alexandra of Saxe-Altenburg (1830–1911) m. Grand Duke Konstantin Nikolayevich of Russia
 Olga Constantinovna of Russia (1851–1926) m. George I of Greece
 Constantine I of Greece (1868–1923) m. Sophia of Prussia
 Helen of Greece and Denmark (1896–1982) m. Carol II of Romania
 Same as #10 above
 Same as #11 above

The succession is disputed by her cousin Paul Philippe of Romania, who is also a descendent:
 Same as #1 above
 Princess Amalia of Nassau-Dietz (1710–1777) m. Frederick, Hereditary Prince of Baden-Durlach
 Charles Frederick, Grand Duke of Baden (1728–1811) m. Landgravine Caroline Louise of Hesse-Darmstadt
 Charles Louis, Hereditary Prince of Baden (1755–1801) m. Princess Amalie of Hesse-Darmstadt
 Princess Wilhelmine of Baden (1788–1836) m. Louis II, Grand Duke of Hesse
 Marie of Hesse and by Rhine (1824–1880) m. Alexander II of Russia
 Grand Duchess Maria Alexandrovna of Russia (1853–1920) m. Alfred, Duke of Saxe-Coburg and Gotha
 Marie of Romania (1875–1938) m. Ferdinand I of Romania
 Carol II of Romania (1893–1953) m. Zizi Lambrino
 Carol Lambrino (1920–2006) m. Hélène Henriette Nagavitzine
 Paul Philippe of Romania (1948–) m. Lia Georgia Triff

Male line:
 Same as #1 above
 Princess Amalia of Nassau-Dietz (1710–1777) m. Frederick, Hereditary Prince of Baden-Durlach
 Charles Frederick, Grand Duke of Baden (1728–1811) m. Landgravine Caroline Louise of Hesse-Darmstadt
 Charles Louis, Hereditary Prince of Baden (1755–1801) m. Princess Amalie of Hesse-Darmstadt
 Charles, Grand Duke of Baden (1786–1818) m. Stéphanie de Beauharnais
 Princess Josephine of Baden (1813–1900) m. Karl Anton, Prince of Hohenzollern
 Leopold, Prince of Hohenzollern (1835–1905) m. Infanta Antónia of Portugal
 William, Prince of Hohenzollern (1864–1927) m. Princess Maria Teresa of Bourbon-Two Sicilies
 Frederick, Prince of Hohenzollern (1891–1965) m. Princess Margarete Karola of Saxony
 Friedrich Wilhelm, Prince of Hohenzollern (1924–2010) m. Princess Margarita of Leiningen
 Karl Friedrich, Prince of Hohenzollern (1952–)

 Same as #1 above
 Same as #2 above
 Same as #3 above
 Same as #4 above
 Princess Wilhelmine of Baden (1788–1836) m. Louis II, Grand Duke of Hesse
 Marie of Hesse and by Rhine (1824–1880) m. Alexander II of Russia
 Grand Duchess Maria Alexandrovna of Russia (1853–1920) m. Alfred, Duke of Saxe-Coburg and Gotha
 Princess Victoria Melita of Saxe-Coburg and Gotha (1876–1936) m. Grand Duke Kirill Vladimirovich of Russia
 Grand Duchess Maria Kirillovna of Russia (1907–1951) m. Karl, Prince of Leiningen
 Princess Margarita of Leiningen (1932–1996) m. Friedrich Wilhelm, Prince of Hohenzollern
 Same as #11 above

 Same as #1 above
 Same as #2 above
 Same as #3 above
 Same as #4 above
 Same as #5 above
 Same as #6 above
 Grand Duke Vladimir Alexandrovich of Russia (1847–1909) m. Duchess Marie of Mecklenburg-Schwerin
 Grand Duke Kirill Vladimirovich of Russia (1876–1938) m. Princess Victoria Melita of Saxe-Coburg and Gotha
 Same as #9 above
 Same as #10 above
 Same as #11 above

 Same as #1 above
 Same as #2 above
 Same as #3 above
 Same as #4 above
 Caroline of Baden (1776–1841) m. Maximilian I Joseph of Bavaria
 Amalie Auguste of Bavaria (1801–1877) m. John of Saxony
 George, King of Saxony (1832–1904) m. Infanta Maria Ana of Portugal
 Frederick Augustus III of Saxony (1865–1932) m. Archduchess Louise of Austria
 Princess Margarete Karola of Saxony (1900–1962) m. Frederick, Prince of Hohenzollern
 Same as #10 in the first list
 Same as #11 above

 Same as #1 above
 Same as #2 above
 Same as #3 above
 Same as #4 above
 Same as #5 above
 Princess Ludovika of Bavaria (1808–1892) m. Duke Maximilian Joseph in Bavaria
 Duchess Mathilde Ludovika in Bavaria (1843–1925) m. Prince Louis, Count of Trani
 Princess Maria Teresa of Bourbon-Two Sicilies (1867–1909) m. William, Prince of Hohenzollern
 Same as #9 in the first list
 Same as #10 above
 Same as #11 above

 Same as #1 above
 Same as #2 above
 Same as #3 above
 Same as #4 above
 Frederica of Baden (1781–1826) m. Gustav IV Adolf of Sweden
 Princess Sophie of Sweden (1801–1865) m. Leopold, Grand Duke of Baden
 Princess Marie of Baden (1834–1899) m. Ernst, Prince of Leiningen
 Emich, 5th Prince of Leiningen (1866–1939) m. Princess Feodore of Hohenlohe-Langenburg
 Karl, Prince of Leiningen (1898–1946) m. Grand Duchess Maria Kirillovna of Russia
 Same as #10 in the third list
 Same as #11 above

 Same as #1 above
 Same as #2 above
 Same as #3 above but m. Louise Caroline of Hochberg
 Leopold, Grand Duke of Baden (1790–1852) m. Princess Sophie of Sweden
 Same as #7 above
 Same as #8 above
 Same as #9 above
 Same as #10 above
 Same as #11 above

 Same as #1 above
 Same as #2 above
 Same as #3 above
 Prince William of Baden (1792–1859) m. Duchess Elisabeth Alexandrine of Württemberg
 Princess Leopoldine of Baden (1837–1903) m. Hermann, Prince of Hohenlohe-Langenburg
 Princess Feodora of Hohenlohe-Langenburg (1866–1932) m. Emich, Prince of Leiningen
 Same as #7 above
 Same as #8 above
 Same as #9 above

 Same as #1 above
 William IV, Prince of Orange (1711–1751) m. Anne, Princess Royal and Princess of Orange
 Princess Carolina of Orange-Nassau (1743–1787) m. Charles Christian, Prince of Nassau-Weilburg
 Princess Henriette of Nassau-Weilburg (1780–1857) m. Duke Louis of Württemberg
 Duchess Elisabeth Alexandrine of Württemberg (1802–1864) m. Prince William of Baden
 Same as #5 above
 Same as #6 above
 Same as #7 above
 Same as #8 above
 Same as #9 above

 Same as #1 above
 Same as #2 above
 Same as #3 above
 Frederick William, Prince of Nassau-Weilburg (1768–1816) m. Burgravine Louise Isabella of Kirchberg
 Princess Henrietta of Nassau-Weilburg (1797–1829) m. Archduke Charles, Duke of Teschen
 Maria Theresa of Austria (1816–1867) m. Ferdinand II of the Two Sicilies
 Prince Louis, Count of Trani (1838–1886) m. Duchess Mathilde Ludovika in Bavaria
 Same as #8 in the fifth list
 Same as #9 in the first list
 Same as #10 in the first list
 Same as #10 above

 References:

Russia

Tsar Nicholas II of Russia, the last Tsar of Russia, was descended from Friso through his daughter's son:
 John William Friso, Prince of Orange (1687–1711) m. Landgravine Marie Louise of Hesse-Kassel
 Princess Amalia of Nassau-Dietz (1710–1777) m. Frederick, Hereditary Prince of Baden-Durlach
 Charles Frederick, Grand Duke of Baden (1728–1811) m. Landgravine Caroline Louise of Hesse-Darmstadt
 Charles Louis, Hereditary Prince of Baden (1755–1801) m. Princess Amalie of Hesse-Darmstadt
 Princess Wilhelmine of Baden (1788–1836) m. Louis II, Grand Duke of Hesse
 Marie of Hesse and by Rhine (1824–1880) m. Alexander II of Russia
 Alexander III of Russia (1845–1894) m. Dagmar of Denmark
 Nicholas II of Russia (1868–1918) m. Alix of Hesse

The current pretender status to the Russian throne is disputed, but one line descends from Friso, also through his daughter's son:
 Same as #1 above
 Same as #2 above
 Same as #3 above
 Same as #4 above
 Same as #5 above
 Same as #6 above
 Grand Duke Vladimir Alexandrovich of Russia (1847–1909) m. Duchess Marie of Mecklenburg-Schwerin
 Cyril Vladimirovich, Grand Duke of Russia (1876–1938) m. Princess Victoria Melita of Saxe-Coburg and Gotha – pretender
 Grand Duke Vladimir Kirillovich of Russia (1917–1992) m. Princess Leonida Bagration of Mukhrani – pretender
 Maria Vladimirovna, Grand Duchess of Russia (1953–) m. Franz Wilhelm of Prussia – pretender
 Grand Duke George Mikhailovich of Russia (1981–) m. Rebecca Virginia Bettarini

 Same as #1 above
 Same as #2 above
 Same as #3 above
 Same as #4 above
 Same as #5 above
 Same as #6 above
 Grand Duchess Maria Alexandrovna of Russia (1853–1920) m. Alfred, Duke of Saxe-Coburg and Gotha
 Princess Victoria Melita of Saxe-Coburg and Gotha (1876–1936) m. Grand Duke Kirill Vladimirovich of Russia
 Same as #9 above
 Same as #10 above
 Same as #11 above

The current pretender's son also descends from Friso through his father:

 Same as #1 above
 William IV, Prince of Orange (1711–1751) m. Anne, Princess Royal and Princess of Orange
 Princess Carolina of Orange-Nassau (1743–1787) m. Charles Christian, Prince of Nassau-Weilburg
 Princess Louise of Nassau-Weilburg (1765–1837) m. Heinrich XIII, Prince Reuss of Greiz
 Heinrich XX, Prince Reuss of Greiz (1794–1859) m. Princess Caroline of Hesse-Homburg
 Heinrich XXII, Prince Reuss of Greiz (1846–1902) m. Princess Ida of Schaumburg-Lippe
 Hermine Reuss of Greiz (1887–1947) m. Prince Johann of Schönaich-Carolath
 Princess Henriette of Schönaich-Carolath (1918–1972) m. Prince Karl Franz of Prussia
 Prince Franz Wilhelm of Prussia (1943–) m. Grand Duchess Maria Vladimirovna of Russia
 Same as #11 above

 Same as #1 above
 Same as #2 above
 Same as #3 above
 Amelia of Nassau-Weilburg (1776–1841) m. Victor II, Prince of Anhalt-Bernburg-Schaumburg-Hoym
 Princess Emma of Anhalt-Bernburg-Schaumburg-Hoym (1802–1858) m. George II, Prince of Waldeck and Pyrmont
 Princess Hermine of Waldeck and Pyrmont (1827–1910) m. Adolphus I, Prince of Schaumburg-Lippe
 Princess Ida of Schaumburg-Lippe (1852–1891) m. Heinrich XXII, Prince Reuss of Greiz
 Same as #7 above
 Same as #8 above
 Same as #9 above
 Same as #10 above

Another pretender also descends from Friso:
 Same as #1 above
 Princess Amalia of Nassau-Dietz (1710–1777) m. Frederick, Hereditary Prince of Baden-Durlach
 Charles Frederick, Grand Duke of Baden (1728–1811) m. Louise Caroline of Hochberg
 Leopold, Grand Duke of Baden (1790–1852) m. Princess Sophie of Sweden
 Princess Cecilie of Baden (1839–1891) m. Grand Duke Michael Nikolaevich of Russia
 Grand Duke Alexander Mikhailovich of Russia (1866–1933) m. Grand Duchess Xenia Alexandrovna of Russia
 Prince Andrei Alexandrovich of Russia (1897–1981) m. Elisabetta di Sasso Ruffo
 Prince Andrew Romanov (1923–2021) m. Elena Konstantinovna Durnova
 Prince Alexis Andreievich Romanov (1953–)

 Same as #1 above
 Same as #2 above
 Same as #3 above but m. Landgravine Caroline Louise of Hesse-Darmstadt
 Charles Louis, Hereditary Prince of Baden (1755–1801) m. Princess Amalie of Hesse-Darmstadt
 Frederica of Baden (1781–1826) m. Gustav IV Adolf of Sweden
 Princess Sophie of Sweden (1801–1865) m. Leopold, Grand Duke of Baden
 Same as #5 above
 Same as #6 above
 Same as #7 above
 Same as #8 above
 Same as #9 above

 Same as #1 above
 Same as #2 above
 Same as #3 above
 Same as #4 above
 Princess Wilhelmine of Baden (1788–1836) m. Louis II, Grand Duke of Hesse
 Marie of Hesse and by Rhine (1824–1880) m. Alexander II of Russia
 Alexander III of Russia (1845–1894) m. Dagmar of Denmark
 Grand Duchess Xenia Alexandrovna of Russia (1875–1960) m. Grand Duke Alexander Mikhailovich of Russia
 Same as #9 above
 Same as #10 above
 Same as #11 above
 Reference:

Another descendent claims the throne and is descended from Friso in multiple ways:

 Same as #1 above
 Princess Amalia of Nassau-Dietz (1710–1777) m. Frederick, Hereditary Prince of Baden-Durlach
 Charles Frederick, Grand Duke of Baden (1728–1811) m. Landgravine Caroline Louise of Hesse-Darmstadt
 Charles Louis, Hereditary Prince of Baden (1755–1801) m. Princess Amalie of Hesse-Darmstadt
 Princess Wilhelmine of Baden (1788–1836) m. Louis II, Grand Duke of Hesse
 Marie of Hesse and by Rhine (1824–1880) m. Alexander II of Russia
 Grand Duke Vladimir Alexandrovich of Russia (1847–1909) m. Duchess Marie of Mecklenburg-Schwerin
 Grand Duke Kirill Vladimirovich of Russia (1876–1938) m. Princess Victoria Melita of Saxe-Coburg and Gotha
 Grand Duchess Maria Kirillovna of Russia (1907–1951) m. Karl, Prince of Leiningen
 Emich Kyrill, Prince of Leiningen (1926–1991) m. Duchess Eilika of Oldenburg
 Prince Karl Emich of Leiningen (1952–)

 Same as #1 above
 Same as #2 above
 Same as #3 above
 Same as #4 above
 Same as #5 above
 Same as #6 above
 Grand Duchess Maria Alexandrovna of Russia (1853–1920) m. Alfred, Duke of Saxe-Coburg and Gotha
 Princess Victoria Melita of Saxe-Coburg and Gotha (1876–1936) m. Grand Duke Kirill Vladimirovich of Russia
 Same as #9 above
 Same as #10 above
 Same as #11 above

 Same as #1 above
 Same as #2 above
 Same as #3 above
 Same as #4 above
 Frederica of Baden (1781–1826) m. Gustav IV Adolf of Sweden
 Princess Sophie of Sweden (1801–1865) m. Leopold, Grand Duke of Baden
 Princess Marie of Baden (1834–1899) m. Ernst, Prince of Leiningen
 Emich, Prince of Leiningen (1866–1939) m. Princess Feodore of Hohenlohe-Langenburg
 Karl, Prince of Leiningen (1898–1946) m. Grand Duchess Maria Kirillovna of Russia
 Same as #10 above
 Same as #11 above

 Same as #1 above
 Same as #2 above
 Same as #3 above but m. Louise Caroline of Hochberg
 Leopold, Grand Duke of Baden (1790–1852) m. Princess Sophie of Sweden
 Same as #7 above
 Same as #8 above
 Same as #9 above
 Same as #10 above
 Same as #11 above

 Same as #1 above
 Same as #2 above
 Same as #3 above
 Prince William of Baden (1792–1859) m. Duchess Elisabeth Alexandrine of Württemberg
 Princess Leopoldine of Baden (1837–1903) m. Hermann, Prince of Hohenlohe-Langenburg
 Princess Feodora of Hohenlohe-Langenburg (1866–1932) m. Emich, Prince of Leiningen
 Same as #7 above
 Same as #8 above
 Same as #9 above

 Same as #1 above
 William IV, Prince of Orange (1711–1751) m. Anne, Princess Royal and Princess of Orange
 Princess Carolina of Orange-Nassau (1743–1787) m. Charles Christian, Prince of Nassau-Weilburg
 Princess Henriette of Nassau-Weilburg (1780–1857) m. Duke Louis of Württemberg
 Duchess Elisabeth Alexandrine of Württemberg (1780–1857) m. Prince William of Baden
 Same as #5 above
 Same as #6 above
 Same as #7 above
 Same as #8 above
 Same as #9 above

 Same as #1 above
 Same as #2 above
 Same as #3 above
 Same as #4 above
 Duchess Amelia of Württemberg (1799–1848) m. Joseph, Duke of Saxe-Altenburg
 Princess Elisabeth of Saxe-Altenburg (1826–1896) m. Peter II, Grand Duke of Oldenburg
 Frederick Augustus II, Grand Duke of Oldenburg (1852–1931) m. Duchess Elisabeth Alexandrine of Mecklenburg-Schwerin
 Nikolaus, Hereditary Grand Duke of Oldenburg (1897–1970) m. Princess Helena of Waldeck and Pyrmont
 Duchess Eilika of Oldenburg (1928–2016) m. Emich Kyrill, Prince of Leiningen
 Same as #10 above

 Same as #1 above
 Same as #2 above
 Same as #3 above
 Amelia of Nassau-Weilburg (1776–1841) m. Victor II, Prince of Anhalt-Bernburg-Schaumburg-Hoym
 Princess Ida of Anhalt-Bernburg-Schaumburg-Hoym (1802–1858) m. Augustus, Grand Duke of Oldenburg
 Peter II, Grand Duke of Oldenburg (1827–1900) m. Princess Elisabeth of Saxe-Altenburg
 Same as #7 above
 Same as #8 above
 Same as #9 above
 Same as #10 above

 Same as #1 above
 Same as #2 above
 Same as #3 above
 Same as #4 above
 Princess Emma of Anhalt-Bernburg-Schaumburg-Hoym (1802–1858) m. George II, Prince of Waldeck and Pyrmont
 George Victor, Prince of Waldeck and Pyrmont (1831–1893) m. Princess Helena of Nassau
 Friedrich, Prince of Waldeck and Pyrmont (1865–1946) m. Princess Bathildis of Schaumburg-Lippe
 Princess Helena of Waldeck and Pyrmont (1899–1948) m. Nikolaus, Hereditary Grand Duke of Oldenburg
 Same as #9 above
 Same as #10 above

 Same as #1 above
 Same as #2 above
 Same as #3 above
 Frederick William, Prince of Nassau-Weilburg (1768–1816) m. Burgravine Louise Isabella of Kirchberg
 William, Duke of Nassau (1792–1839) m. Princess Pauline of Württemberg
 Princess Helena of Nassau (1831–1888) m. George Victor, Prince of Waldeck and Pyrmont
 Same as #7 above
 Same as #8 above
 Same as #9 above
 Same as #10 above

Spain

King Felipe VI of Spain is descended from Friso through his son's daughter in five ways and his daughter's son in one:
 John William Friso, Prince of Orange (1687–1711) m. Landgravine Marie Louise of Hesse-Kassel
 William IV, Prince of Orange (1711–1751) m. Anne, Princess Royal and Princess of Orange
 Princess Carolina of Orange-Nassau (1743–1787) m. Charles Christian, Prince of Nassau-Weilburg
 Princess Henriette of Nassau-Weilburg (1780–1857) m. Duke Louis of Württemberg
 Duchess Maria Dorothea of Württemberg (1797–1855) m. Archduke Joseph, Palatine of Hungary
 Archduchess Elisabeth Franziska of Austria (1831–1903) m. Archduke Karl Ferdinand of Austria
 Maria Christina of Austria (1858–1929) m. Alfonso XII of Spain
 Alfonso XIII of Spain (1886–1941) m. Victoria Eugenie of Battenberg
 Infante Juan, Count of Barcelona (1913–1993) m. Princess María de las Mercedes of Bourbon-Two Sicilies
 Juan Carlos I of Spain (1938–) m. Sophia of Greece and Denmark
 Felipe VI of Spain (1968–) m. Letizia Ortiz Rocasolano

 Same as #1 above
 Same as #2 above
 Same as #3 above
 Frederick William, Prince of Nassau-Weilburg (1768-1816) m. Burgravine Louise Isabelle of Kirchberg
 Princess Henrietta of Nassau-Weilburg (1797-1829) m. Archduke Charles, Duke of Teschen
 Archduke Karl Ferdinand of Austria (1818-1874) m. Archduchess Elisabeth Franziska of Austria
 Same as #7 above 
 Same as #8 above
 Same as #9 above
 Same as #10 above
 Same as #11 above

 Same as #1 above
 Same as #2 above
 Same as #3 above
 Same as #4 above
 Same as #5 above
 Maria Theresa of Austria (1816–1867) m. Ferdinand II of the Two Sicilies
 Prince Alfonso, Count of Caserta (1841–1934) m. Princess Maria Antonietta of Bourbon-Two Sicilies
 Prince Carlos of Bourbon-Two Sicilies (1870–1949) m. Princess Louise of Orléans
 Princess María de las Mercedes of Bourbon-Two Sicilies (1910–2000) m. Infante Juan, Count of Barcelona
 Same as #10 above
 Same as #11 above

 Same as #1 above
 Princess Amalia of Nassau-Dietz (1710–1777) m. Frederick, Hereditary Prince of Baden-Durlach
 Charles Frederick, Grand Duke of Baden (1728–1811) m. Landgravine Caroline Louise of Hesse-Darmstadt
 Charles Louis, Hereditary Prince of Baden (1755–1801) m. Princess Amalie of Hesse-Darmstadt
 Princess Wilhelmine of Baden (1788–1836) m. Louis II, Grand Duke of Hesse
 Prince Alexander of Hesse and by Rhine (1823–1888) m. Princess Julia of Battenberg
 Prince Henry of Battenberg (1858–1896) m. Princess Beatrice of the United Kingdom
 Victoria Eugenie of Battenberg (1887–1969) m. Alfonso XIII of Spain
 Same as #9 above in the second list
 Same as #10 above
 Same as #11 above

 Same as #1 above 
 Same as #2 above in first list
 Same as #3 above in first list
 Same as #4 above in first list
 Duchess Amelia of Württemberg (1799–1848) m. Joseph, Duke of Saxe-Altenburg
 Princess Alexandra of Saxe-Altenburg (1830–1911) m. Grand Duke Konstantin Nikolayevich of Russia
 Olga Constantinovna of Russia (1851–1926) m. George I of Greece
 Constantine I of Greece (1868–1923) m. Sophia of Prussia
 Paul of Greece (1901–1964) m. Frederica of Hanover
 Sophia of Greece and Denmark (1938–) m. Juan Carlos I of Spain
 Same as #11 above

 Same as #1 above
 Same as #2 above
 Same as #3 above
 Same as #4 above
 Same as #5 above
 Marie of Saxe-Altenburg (1818–1907) m. George V of Hanover
 Ernest Augustus, Crown Prince of Hanover (1845–1923) m. Princess Thyra of Denmark
 Ernest Augustus, Duke of Brunswick (1887–1953) m. Princess Victoria Louise of Prussia
 Frederica of Hanover (1917–1981) m. Paul of Greece 
 Same as #10 above 
 Same as #11 above
 Reference:

Sweden

King Carl XVI Gustaf of Sweden is descended from Friso through his son's daughter in three ways and his daughter's son in two:
 John William Friso, Prince of Orange (1687–1711) m. Landgravine Marie Louise of Hesse-Kassel
 William IV, Prince of Orange (1711–1751) m. Anne, Princess Royal and Princess of Orange
 Princess Carolina of Orange-Nassau (1743–1787) m. Charles Christian, Prince of Nassau-Weilburg
 Frederick William, Prince of Nassau-Weilburg (1768–1816) m. Burgravine Louise Isabelle of Kirchberg
 William, Duke of Nassau (1792–1839) m. Princess Pauline of Württemberg
 Sophia of Nassau (1836–1913) m. Oscar II of Sweden
 Gustaf V of Sweden (1858–1950) m. Victoria of Baden
 Gustaf VI Adolf of Sweden (1882–1973) m. Princess Margaret of Connaught
 Prince Gustaf Adolf, Duke of Västerbotten (1906–1947) m. Princess Sibylla of Saxe-Coburg and Gotha
 Carl XVI Gustaf of Sweden (1946–) m. Silvia Sommerlath

 Same as #1 above
 Princess Amalia of Nassau-Dietz (1710–1777) m. Frederick, Hereditary Prince of Baden-Durlach
 Charles Frederick, Grand Duke of Baden (1728–1811) m. Louise Caroline of Hochberg
 Leopold, Grand Duke of Baden (1790–1852) m. Princess Sophie of Sweden
 Frederick I, Grand Duke of Baden (1826–1907) m. Princess Louise of Prussia
 Victoria of Baden (1862–1930) m. Gustaf V of Sweden
 Same as #8 above
 Same as #9 above
 Same as #10 above

 Same as #1 above
 Same as #2 above
 Same as #3 above, but m. Landgravine Caroline Louise of Hesse-Darmstadt
 Charles Louis, Hereditary Prince of Baden (1755–1801) m. Princess Amalie of Hesse-Darmstadt
 Frederica of Baden (1781–1826) m. Gustav IV Adolf of Sweden
 Princess Sophie of Sweden (1801–1865) m. Leopold, Grand Duke of Baden
 Same as #5 above
 Same as #6 above
 Same as #7 above
 Same as #8 above
 Same as #9 above

 Same as #1 above
 Same as #2 above in first list
 Same as #3 above in first list
 Amelia of Nassau-Weilburg (1776–1841) m. Victor II, Prince of Anhalt-Bernburg-Schaumburg-Hoym
 Princess Emma of Anhalt-Bernburg-Schaumburg-Hoym (1802–1858) m. George II, Prince of Waldeck and Pyrmont
 George Victor, Prince of Waldeck and Pyrmont (1831–1893) m. Princess Helena of Nassau
 Princess Helena of Waldeck and Pyrmont (1861–1922) m. Prince Leopold, Duke of Albany
 Charles Edward, Duke of Saxe-Coburg and Gotha (1884–1954) m. Princess Victoria Adelaide of Schleswig-Holstein
 Princess Sibylla of Saxe-Coburg and Gotha (1908–1972) m. Prince Gustaf Adolf, Duke of Västerbotten
 Same as #11 above

 Same as #1 above
 Same as #2 above
 Same as #3 above
 Same as #4 above in first list
 Same as #5 above in first list
 Princess Helena of Nassau (1831–1888) m. George Victor, Prince of Waldeck and Pyrmont
 Same as #7 above
 Same as #8 above
 Same as #9 above
 Same as #10 above
 References:

United Kingdom

King Charles III of the United Kingdom is descended from Friso through his son's daughter and his daughter's son each in two ways:
 John William Friso, Prince of Orange (1687–1711) m. Landgravine Marie Louise of Hesse-Kassel
 William IV, Prince of Orange (1711–1751) m. Anne, Princess Royal and Princess of Orange
 Princess Carolina of Orange-Nassau (1743–1787) m. Charles Christian, Prince of Nassau-Weilburg
 Princess Henriette of Nassau-Weilburg (1780–1857) m. Duke Louis of Württemberg
 Duke Alexander of Württemberg (1804–1885) m. Countess Claudine Rhédey von Kis-Rhéde
 Francis, Duke of Teck (1837–1900) m. Princess Mary Adelaide of Cambridge
 Mary of Teck (1867–1953) m. George V of the United Kingdom
 George VI of the United Kingdom (1895–1952) m. Elizabeth Bowes-Lyon
 Queen Elizabeth II of the United Kingdom (1926–2022) m. Prince Philip of Greece and Denmark
 Charles III of the United Kingdom (1948–) m. Camilla Shand

 Same as #1 above
 Same as #2 above
 Same as #3 above
 Same as #4 above
 Duchess Amelia of Württemberg (1799–1848) m. Joseph, Duke of Saxe-Altenburg
 Princess Alexandra of Saxe-Altenburg (1830–1911) m. Grand Duke Konstantin Nikolayevich of Russia
 Olga Constantinovna of Russia (1851–1926) m. George I of Greece
 Prince Andrew of Greece and Denmark (1882–1944) m. Princess Alice of Battenberg
 Prince Philip of Greece and Denmark (1921–2021) m. Queen Elizabeth II of the United Kingdom
 Same as #10 above

 Same as #1 above
 Princess Amalia of Nassau-Dietz (1710–1777) m. Frederick, Hereditary Prince of Baden-Durlach
 Charles Frederick, Grand Duke of Baden (1728–1811) m. Landgravine Caroline Louise of Hesse-Darmstadt
 Charles Louis, Hereditary Prince of Baden (1755–1801) m. Princess Amalie of Hesse-Darmstadt
 Princess Wilhelmine of Baden (1788–1836) m. Louis II, Grand Duke of Hesse
 Prince Alexander of Hesse and by Rhine (1823–1888) m. Princess Julia of Battenberg
 Prince Louis of Battenberg (1854–1921) m. Princess Victoria of Hesse and by Rhine
 Princess Alice of Battenberg (1885–1969) m. Prince Andrew of Greece and Denmark
 Same as #9 above
 Same as #10 above

 Same as #1 above
 Same as #2 above
 Same as #3 above
 Same as #4 above
 Same as #5 above
 Prince Charles of Hesse and by Rhine (1809–1877) m. Princess Elisabeth of Prussia
 Louis IV, Grand Duke of Hesse (1837–1892) m. Princess Alice of the United Kingdom
 Princess Victoria of Hesse and by Rhine (1863–1950) m. Prince Louis of Battenberg
 Same as #8 above
 Same as #9 above
 Same as #10 above
 References:

Yugoslavia

King Peter II of Yugoslavia was descended from his daughter's son in two ways:
 John William Friso, Prince of Orange (1687–1711) m. Landgravine Marie Louise of Hesse-Kassel
 Princess Amalia of Nassau-Dietz (1710–1777) m. Frederick, Hereditary Prince of Baden-Durlach
 Charles Frederick, Grand Duke of Baden (1728–1811) m. Landgravine Caroline Louise of Hesse-Darmstadt
 Charles Louis, Hereditary Prince of Baden (1755–1801) m. Princess Amalie of Hesse-Darmstadt
 Princess Wilhelmine of Baden (1788–1836) m. Louis II, Grand Duke of Hesse
 Marie of Hesse and by Rhine (1824–1880) m. Alexander II of Russia
 Grand Duchess Maria Alexandrovna of Russia (1853–1920) m. Alfred, Duke of Saxe-Coburg and Gotha
 Marie of Romania (1875–1938) m. Ferdinand I of Romania
 Maria of Romania (1900–1961) m. Alexander I of Yugoslavia
 Peter II of Yugoslavia (1923–1970) m. Alexandra of Greece and Denmark 
 Alexander, Crown Prince of Yugoslavia (1945–) m. Maria of Orléans-Braganza – pretender

 Same as #1 above
 Same as #2 above
 Same as #3 above
 Charles, Grand Duke of Baden (1786–1818) m. Stéphanie de Beauharnais
 Princess Josephine of Baden (1813–1900) m. Karl Anton, Prince of Hohenzollern
 Leopold, Prince of Hohenzollern (1835–1905) m. Infanta Antónia of Portugal
 Ferdinand I of Romania (1865–1927) m. Marie of Edinburgh
 Same as #9 above
 Same as #10 above
 Same as #11 above

The current pretender's mother was a Princess of Greece as the granddaughter of King Constantine I of Greece.
Through her, the current pretender is also descended from Friso's son's daughter.
 Reference:

 Same as #1 above
 William IV, Prince of Orange (1711–1751) m. Anne, Princess Royal
 Princess Carolina of Orange-Nassau (1743–1787) m. Charles Christian, Prince of Nassau-Weilburg
 Princess Henriette of Nassau-Weilburg (1780–1857) m. Duke Louis of Württemberg
 Duchess Amelia of Württemberg (1799–1848) m. Joseph, Duke of Saxe-Altenburg
 Princess Alexandra of Saxe-Altenburg (1830–1911) m. Grand Duke Konstantin Nikolayevich of Russia
 Grand Duchess Olga Constantinovna of Russia (1851–1926) m. George I of Greece
 Constantine I of Greece (1868–1923) m. Princess Sophia of Prussia
 Alexander of Greece (1893–1920) m. Aspasia Manos
 Princess Alexandra of Greece and Denmark (1921–1993) m. Peter II of Yugoslavia
 Same as #11 above

The pretender's son also descends from Friso through his mother:

 Same as #1 above
 Same as #2 above
 Same as #3 above
 Frederick William, Prince of Nassau-Weilburg (1768–1816) m. Burgravine Louise Isabelle of Kirchberg
 Princess Henrietta of Nassau-Weilburg (1797–1829) m. Archduke Charles, Duke of Teschen
 Archduchess Maria Theresa of Austria (1816–1867) m. Ferdinand II of the Two Sicilies
 Prince Alfonso, Count of Caserta (1841–1934) m. Princess Maria Antonietta of Bourbon-Two Sicilies
 Prince Carlos of Bourbon-Two Sicilies (1870–1949) m. Princess Louise of Orléans
 Princess María de la Esperanza of Bourbon-Two Sicilies (1914–2005) m. Prince Pedro Gastão of Orléans-Braganza
 Princess Maria da Glória of Orléans-Braganza (1946–) m. Alexander, Crown Prince of Yugoslavia
 Philip, Hereditary Prince of Yugoslavia (1982–) m. Danica Marinković

References

 

Friso
House of Orange-Nassau